

1001–1100 

|-
| 1001 Gaussia || 1923 OA || Carl Friedrich Gauss (1777–1855), German mathematician || 
|-id=002
| 1002 Olbersia || 1923 OB || Heinrich Olbers (1758–1840), German astronomer || 
|-id=003
| 1003 Lilofee || 1923 OK || Lilofee, a legendary character and title figure in an old German folk-song Die schöne junge Lilofee || 
|-id=004
| 1004 Belopolskya || 1923 OS || Aristarkh Belopolsky (1854–1934), Russian astrophysicist || 
|-id=005
| 1005 Arago || 1923 OT || François Arago (1786–1853), French astronomer || 
|-id=006
| 1006 Lagrangea || 1923 OU || Joseph-Louis Lagrange (1736–1813), French astronomer || 
|-id=007
| 1007 Pawlowia || 1923 OX || Ivan Pavlov (1849–1936), Russian physiologist || 
|-id=008
| 1008 La Paz || 1923 PD || The city of La Paz, capital of Bolivia || 
|-id=009
| 1009 Sirene || 1923 PE || The Sirens of mythology || 
|-id=010
| 1010 Marlene || 1923 PF || Marlene Dietrich (1901–1992), German actress || 
|-id=011
| 1011 Laodamia || 1924 PK || Laodamia, daughter of Bellerophon and Philonoe in Greek mythology, and the mother (by Zeus) of Sarpedon; shot dead by Artemis whilst weaving || 
|-id=012
| 1012 Sarema || 1924 PM || Sarema, a character in a poem by Aleksandr Sergeyevich Pushkin, made into an opera by Alexander von Zemlinsky || 
|-id=013
| 1013 Tombecka || 1924 PQ || Daniel Tombeck, French chemist who in 1910 succeeded Amédée Guillet as secretary of the Faculty of Science of the University of Paris || 
|-id=014
| 1014 Semphyra || 1924 PW || Semphyra, a character in a poem by Aleksandr Sergeyevich Pushkin || 
|-id=015
| 1015 Christa || 1924 QF || Unknown origin of name || 
|-id=016
| 1016 Anitra || 1924 QG || Anitra, character in the drama Peer Gynt by Henrik Ibsen (1828–1906) || 
|-id=017
| 1017 Jacqueline || 1924 QL || Jacqueline Zadoc-Kahn, disciple of Russian discoverer Benjamin Jekhowsky || 
|-id=018
| 1018 Arnolda || 1924 QM || Arnold Berliner (1862–1942), German physicist and editor of the journal Naturwissenschaften || 
|-id=019
| 1019 Strackea || 1924 QN || Gustav Stracke (1887–1943), German astronomer (see also  and ) || 
|-id=020
| 1020 Arcadia || 1924 QV || Arcadia, mythological Greek place and modern Greek province || 
|-id=021
| 1021 Flammario || 1924 RG || Camille Flammarion (1842–1925), French astronomer || 
|-id=022
| 1022 Olympiada || 1924 RT || Olimpiada Albitskaya, mother of the discoverer || 
|-id=023
| 1023 Thomana || 1924 RU || Boys' choir of St. Thomas Church, Leipzig, Germany || 
|-id=024
| 1024 Hale ||  || George Ellery Hale (1868–1938), American solar astronomer || 
|-id=025
| 1025 Riema || 1923 NX || Johannes Riem (1868–1945), German astronomer || 
|-id=026
| 1026 Ingrid || 1923 NY || Ingrid, niece of German astronomer Albrecht Kahrstedt (1897–1971), also see  || 
|-id=027
| 1027 Aesculapia ||  || Asclepius, Greek god; named to redeem Jupiter's promise to Minerva to place Aesculapius among the stars (formerly, Ophiuchus was called Aesculapius) || 
|-id=028
| 1028 Lydina || 1923 PG || Lydia Albitskaya, wife of Russian discoverer Vladimir Albitsky || 
|-id=029
| 1029 La Plata || 1924 RK || La Plata, Argentina || 
|-id=030
| 1030 Vitja || 1924 RQ || Viktor Zaslavsky (1925–1944), nephew of Spiridon Zaslavskij (see ), the brother-in-law of the discoverer Vladimir Albitsky || 
|-id=031
| 1031 Arctica || 1924 RR || The Arctic || 
|-id=032
| 1032 Pafuri || 1924 SA || Pafuri River in northern Transvaal, South Africa || 
|-id=033
| 1033 Simona || 1924 SM || Simone van Biesbroeck, daughter of the discoverer George Van Biesbroeck || 
|-id=034
| 1034 Mozartia || 1924 SS || Wolfgang Amadeus Mozart (1756–1791), Austrian composer || 
|-id=035
| 1035 Amata || 1924 SW || Amata, wife of king Latinus and mother of Lavinia, the wife of Aeneas || 
|-id=036
| 1036 Ganymed || 1924 TD || Ganymede, mythological cupbearer || 
|-id=037
| 1037 Davidweilla || 1924 TF || One of the members of the David-Weill family, member of the Academy of Sciences and benefactor of the Sorbonne || 
|-id=038
| 1038 Tuckia || 1924 TK || Edward Tuck (1842–1938) and his wife; philanthropists. Edward was the son of the founder of the American Republican Party || 
|-id=039
| 1039 Sonneberga || 1924 TL || German town of Sonneberg in Thuringia, where the Sonneberg Observatory is located || 
|-id=040
| 1040 Klumpkea || 1925 BD || Dorothea Klumpke (1861–1942), American amateur astronomer, first woman to receive a Ph.D. in Mathematics from the Sorbonne || 
|-id=041
| 1041 Asta || 1925 FA || Asta Nielsen (1881–1972), Danish actress || 
|-id=042
| 1042 Amazone || 1925 HA || The River Amazon in South America || 
|-id=043
| 1043 Beate || 1925 HB || Unknown origin of name || 
|-id=044
| 1044 Teutonia || 1924 RO || The Teutonic peoples || 
|-id=045
| 1045 Michela || 1924 TR || Micheline van Biesbroeck, daughter of discoverer George Van Biesbroeck || 
|-id=046
| 1046 Edwin || 1924 UA || Edwin van Biesbroeck, son of discoverer George Van Biesbroeck || 
|-id=047
| 1047 Geisha || 1924 TE || Musical comedy The Geisha by Sidney Jones || 
|-id=048
| 1048 Feodosia || 1924 TP || Crimean city of Feodosiya (Theodosia), Ukraine || 
|-id=049
| 1049 Gotho || 1925 RB || Unknown origin of name || 
|-id=050
| 1050 Meta || 1925 RC || Unknown origin of name || 
|-id=051
| 1051 Merope || 1925 SA || Merope, Greek muse and goddess || 
|-id=052
| 1052 Belgica || 1925 VD || Belgium || 
|-id=053
| 1053 Vigdis || 1925 WA || Unknown origin of name (Vigdís is an ancient Nordic feminine surname) || 
|-id=054
| 1054 Forsytia || 1925 WD || The flowering shrub genus Forsythia || 
|-id=055
| 1055 Tynka || 1925 WG || Tynka, mother of Emil Buchar (1901–1979), of the Institute of Astronomy and Geophysics, Czech Technical University in Prague || 
|-id=056
| 1056 Azalea || 1924 QD || The azalea flowering shrubs, then thought a genus of their own, now subgenera of the genus Rhododendron || 
|-id=057
| 1057 Wanda || 1925 QB || Polish feminine name || 
|-id=058
| 1058 Grubba || 1925 MA || Sir Howard Grubb (1844–1931) of Parson and Co., Newcastle upon Tyne, England, maker of the 40-inch reflecting telescope of the Simeis Observatory || 
|-id=059
| 1059 Mussorgskia || 1925 OA || Modest Mussorgsky (1839–1881), Russian composer || 
|-id=060
| 1060 Magnolia || 1925 PA || The flowering tree genus Magnolia || 
|-id=061
| 1061 Paeonia || 1925 TB || The peony flowering plant, genus Paeonia || 
|-id=062
| 1062 Ljuba || 1925 TD || Lyuba Berlin (1915–1936), Soviet parachutist || 
|-id=063
| 1063 Aquilegia || 1925 XA || The columbine flower, genus Aquilegia || 
|-id=064
| 1064 Aethusa || 1926 PA || The fool's parsley herb, genus Aethusa || 
|-id=065
| 1065 Amundsenia || 1926 PD || Roald Amundsen (1872–1928), polar explorer || 
|-id=066
| 1066 Lobelia || 1926 RA || The Indian tobacco flower, genus Lobelia || 
|-id=067
| 1067 Lunaria || 1926 RG || The honesty flowering plant, genus Lunaria || 
|-id=068
| 1068 Nofretete || 1926 RK || Nefertiti (c. 1370 – c. 1330 BC), wife of the Egyptian pharaoh Amenhotep IV || 
|-id=069
| 1069 Planckia || 1927 BC || Max Planck (1858–1947), German physicist and Nobelist, on the occasion of his 80th birthday || 
|-id=070
| 1070 Tunica || 1926 RB || The flowering plant genus Tunica of the pink or carnation family || 
|-id=071
| 1071 Brita || 1924 RE || Great Britain, where the 1-meter telescope for the Simeiz Observatory on Crimea was made || 
|-id=072
| 1072 Malva || 1926 TA || The mallow plant, genus Malva || 
|-id=073
| 1073 Gellivara || 1923 OW || Gällivare, town in Swedish Lapland, where astronomers from several countries observed a total solar eclipse on 29 June 1927 || 
|-id=074
| 1074 Beljawskya || 1925 BE || Sergey Belyavsky (1883–1953), Russian astronomer and discoverer of minor planets || 
|-id=075
| 1075 Helina || 1926 SC || Helij Grigor'evich Neujmin, a son of Russian discoverer Grigory Neujmin || 
|-id=076
| 1076 Viola || 1926 TE || The violets, pansies and violas, genus Viola || 
|-id=077
| 1077 Campanula || 1926 TK || The flowering plant genus Campanula || 
|-id=078
| 1078 Mentha || 1926 XB || The true mints, genus Mentha || 
|-id=079
| 1079 Mimosa || 1927 AD || The herb and shrub genus Mimosa, although the discoverer apparently meant the silk tree (Albizia julibrissin), since he referred to a "flowering tree" || 
|-id=080
| 1080 Orchis || 1927 QB || The orchid flowers, genus Orchis || 
|-id=081
| 1081 Reseda || 1927 QF || The mignonette, genus Reseda || 
|-id=082
| 1082 Pirola || 1927 UC || The wintergreen, genus Pirola || 
|-id=083
| 1083 Salvia || 1928 BC || The sage plant, genus Salvia || 
|-id=084
| 1084 Tamariwa || 1926 CC || Tamara Ivanova (1912–1936), Soviet parachutist || 
|-id=085
| 1085 Amaryllis || 1927 QH || The belladonna lily flower genus, Amaryllis || 
|-id=086
| 1086 Nata || 1927 QL || Nata Babushkina (1915–1936), Soviet female parachutist || 
|-id=087
| 1087 Arabis || 1927 RD || The mustard family herb genus Arabis || 
|-id=088
| 1088 Mitaka || 1927 WA || Mitaka, Tokyo, where the Tokyo Astronomical Observatory is situated || 
|-id=089
| 1089 Tama || 1927 WB || Tama River, Japan, which flows near the Tokyo Astronomical Observatory || 
|-id=090
| 1090 Sumida || 1928 DG || Sumida River (Sumidagawa), Tokyo, Japan || 
|-id=091
| 1091 Spiraea || 1928 DT || The flowering shrub genus Spiraea || 
|-id=092
| 1092 Lilium || 1924 PN || The true lily flower, genus Lilium || 
|-id=093
| 1093 Freda || 1925 LA || Fred Prévost, civil engineer of mines and benefactor of the Faculty of sciences of Bordeaux || 
|-id=094
| 1094 Siberia || 1926 CB || Siberia, region of Russia || 
|-id=095
| 1095 Tulipa || 1926 GS || The tulip flower. genus Tulipa || 
|-id=096
| 1096 Reunerta || 1928 OB || Theodore Reunert, of the South African Association for the Advancement of Science, mining engineer and supporter of the former Union Observatory in South Africa, friend of the discoverer || 
|-id=097
| 1097 Vicia || 1928 PC || The flowering plant genus Vicia || 
|-id=098
| 1098 Hakone || 1928 RJ || Hakone, Japan || 
|-id=099
| 1099 Figneria || 1928 RQ || Vera Figner (1852–1942), Russian revolutionary || 
|-id=100
| 1100 Arnica || 1928 SD || The lamb's skin plants, genus Arnica || 
|}

1101–1200 

|-
| 1101 Clematis || 1928 SJ || The clematis flower, genus Clematis || 
|-id=102
| 1102 Pepita || 1928 VA || Pepito, nickname of discoverer Josep Comas i Solà (1868–1937), using a feminine Latin suffix || 
|-id=103
| 1103 Sequoia || 1928 VB || Sequoia National Park || 
|-id=104
| 1104 Syringa || 1928 XA || The lilac, genus Syringa || 
|-id=105
| 1105 Fragaria || 1929 AB || The strawberry, genus Fragaria || 
|-id=106
| 1106 Cydonia || 1929 CW || The quince, genus Cydonia || 
|-id=107
| 1107 Lictoria || 1929 FB || Lictoria, Italy, a new city established on reclaimed land near Rome during the Fascist regime || 
|-id=108
| 1108 Demeter || 1929 KA || Demeter, Greek goddess || 
|-id=109
| 1109 Tata || 1929 CU || The small town of Tata in Hungary || 
|-id=110
| 1110 Jaroslawa || 1928 PD || The town of Jarosław in south-eastern Poland || 
|-id=111
| 1111 Reinmuthia || 1927 CO || Karl Reinmuth (1892–1979), German astronomer and discoverer of minor planets || 
|-id=112
| 1112 Polonia || 1928 PE || Polonia, Latin for Poland || 
|-id=113
| 1113 Katja || 1928 QC || Katja, Russian feminine name || 
|-id=114
| 1114 Lorraine || 1928 WA || Lorraine in northeastern France, former duchy and remnant of the medieval kingdom of Lotharingia || 
|-id=115
| 1115 Sabauda || 1928 XC || Sabauda, Latin name of the House of Savoy || 
|-id=116
| 1116 Catriona || 1929 GD || Catriona, a Scottish feminine name, title of one of Robert Louis Stevenson's novels || 
|-id=117
| 1117 Reginita || 1927 KA || Reginita, niece of Catalan discoverer Josep Comas i Solà || 
|-id=118
| 1118 Hanskya || 1927 QD || Alexis Hansky (1872–1908), Russian astronomer || 
|-id=119
| 1119 Euboea || 1927 UB || Euboea, Greece || 
|-id=120
| 1120 Cannonia || 1928 RV || Annie Jump Cannon (1863–1941), American astronomer || 
|-id=121
| 1121 Natascha || 1928 RZ || Natasha (Natalia) Tichomirova, Russian hydro-geologist and daughter of the Simeis astronomer Grigory Neujmin || 
|-id=122
| 1122 Neith || 1928 SB || Neith, Egyptian goddess || 
|-id=123
| 1123 Shapleya || 1928 ST || Harlow Shapley (1885–1972), American astronomer || 
|-id=124
| 1124 Stroobantia || 1928 TB || Paul Stroobant (1868–1936), Belgian astronomer || 
|-id=125
| 1125 China ||  || China || 
|-id=126
| 1126 Otero || 1929 AC || Caroline Otéro (1868–1965), known as "La Belle Otero", a Galician-born dancer, actress and courtesan || 
|-id=127
| 1127 Mimi || 1929 AJ || Wife of Eugène Delporte; 1127 Mimi and 1145 Robelmonte had their proposed names swapped by error || 
|-id=128
| 1128 Astrid || 1929 EB || Astrid of Sweden (1905–1935), Queen consort of King Leopold III of Belgium || 
|-id=129
| 1129 Neujmina || 1929 PH || Grigory Neujmin (1885–1946), Russian astronomer and discoverer of minor planets || 
|-id=130
| 1130 Skuld || 1929 RC || Skuld, in Norse mythology, one of the three Norns, the Future || 
|-id=131
| 1131 Porzia || 1929 RO || Character in Shakespeare's play Julius Caesar || 
|-id=132
| 1132 Hollandia ||  || Latin name for the Netherlands || 
|-id=133
| 1133 Lugduna ||  || Feminine form of the Latin name of the Dutch city of Leiden, Lugdunum Batavorum || 
|-id=134
| 1134 Kepler || 1929 SA || Johannes Kepler (1571–1630), astronomer || 
|-id=135
| 1135 Colchis || 1929 TA || Colchis, Asia Minor, now Georgia || 
|-id=136
| 1136 Mercedes || 1929 UA || Sister-in-law of Catalan discoverer Josep Comas i Solà || 
|-id=137
| 1137 Raïssa || 1929 WB || Raïssa Izrailevna Maseeva (1900–1930), a former scientific collaborator at the Pulkovo Observatory || 
|-id=138
| 1138 Attica || 1929 WF || Attica, Greece || 
|-id=139
| 1139 Atami || 1929 XE || Atami, Shizuoka, Japan || 
|-id=140
| 1140 Crimea || 1929 YC || Crimea, peninsula in the Black Sea || 
|-id=141
| 1141 Bohmia || 1930 AA || Mrs. Bohm-Walz, who donated the Walz reflector to the Heidelberg Observatory || 
|-id=142
| 1142 Aetolia || 1930 BC || Aetolia, Greece || 
|-id=143
| 1143 Odysseus || 1930 BH || Odysseus, Greek hero || 
|-id=144
| 1144 Oda || 1930 BJ || Female name chosen by discoverer Karl Reinmuth from the calendar  || 
|-id=145
| 1145 Robelmonte || 1929 CC || Robelmont, Belgium, birthplace of Sylvain Arend; 1127 Mimi and 1145 Robelmonte had their proposed names swapped by error || 
|-id=146
| 1146 Biarmia || 1929 JF || Bjarmaland, legendary land || 
|-id=147
| 1147 Stavropolis || 1929 LF || Stavropol, the city in Russia || 
|-id=148
| 1148 Rarahu || 1929 NA || Tahitian girl's name, from Pierre Loti's novel Rarahu, later reprinted as Le Mariage de Loti || 
|-id=149
| 1149 Volga || 1929 PF || Volga River, Russia || 
|-id=150
| 1150 Achaia || 1929 RB || Achaea, Homeric name for Greece || 
|-id=151
| 1151 Ithaka || 1929 RK || Ithaca, Greece || 
|-id=152
| 1152 Pawona || 1930 AD || Astronomers Johann Palisa and Max Wolf, for their mutual collaboration || 
|-id=153
| 1153 Wallenbergia || 1924 SL || Georg Wallenberg (1864–1924), German mathematician || 
|-id=154
| 1154 Astronomia || 1927 CB || Astronomy || 
|-id=155
| 1155 Aënna || 1928 BD || The astronomy journal Astronomische Nachrichten. Artificial name containing the German pronounced initials "A" and "N" followed by the feminine ending. || 
|-id=156
| 1156 Kira || 1928 DA || Unknown origin of name || 
|-id=157
| 1157 Arabia || 1929 QC || Arabia || 
|-id=158
| 1158 Luda || 1929 QF || Feminine Russian name, diminutive of "Ludmilla" || 
|-id=159
| 1159 Granada || 1929 RD || Granada, Spain || 
|-id=160
| 1160 Illyria || 1929 RL || Illyria, in the Balkans || 
|-id=161
| 1161 Thessalia || 1929 SF || Thessalia, Greece || 
|-id=162
| 1162 Larissa || 1930 AC || Larissa, Greece || 
|-id=163
| 1163 Saga || 1930 BA || The Norse sagas || 
|-id=164
| 1164 Kobolda || 1930 FB || Hermann Kobold (1858–1942), German astronomer, and long-time editor of the Astronomische Nachrichten || 
|-id=165
| 1165 Imprinetta || 1930 HM || Wife of the discoverer, Dutch astronomer Hendrik van Gent || 
|-id=166
| 1166 Sakuntala || 1930 MA || Sakuntala or Shakuntala, a character in an ancient Sanskrit drama || 
|-id=167
| 1167 Dubiago || 1930 PB || Alexander Dubyago (1903–1959), Russian astronomer || 
|-id=168
| 1168 Brandia || 1930 QA || Eugène Brand, Belgian mathematician || 
|-id=169
| 1169 Alwine || 1930 QH || Unknown origin of name || 
|-id=170
| 1170 Siva || 1930 SQ || The Hindu god Shiva or Siva, Lord of Knowledge || 
|-id=171
| 1171 Rusthawelia || 1930 TA || Shota Rustaveli (c. 1160–1220), Georgian poet || 
|-id=172
| 1172 Äneas || 1930 UA || Aeneas, Trojan prince || 
|-id=173
| 1173 Anchises || 1930 UB || Anchises, mythological Trojan || 
|-id=174
| 1174 Marmara || 1930 UC || Sea of Marmara || 
|-id=175
| 1175 Margo || 1930 UD || Unknown origin of name || 
|-id=176
| 1176 Lucidor || 1930 VE || Lucidor, amateur astronomer and friend of the discoverer Eugène Joseph Delporte || 
|-id=177
| 1177 Gonnessia || 1930 WA || François Gonnessiat (1856–1934), French astronomer and director of the Algiers Observatory at Bouzaréah, Algeria || 
|-id=178
| 1178 Irmela || 1931 EC || Irmela Ruska, wife of Ernst Ruska, German inventor of the electron microscope and Nobelist || 
|-id=179
| 1179 Mally || 1931 FD || Daughter-in-law of discoverer, wife of Franz Wolf (presumably Max Wolf's brother) || 
|-id=180
| 1180 Rita || 1931 GE || Unknown origin of name || 
|-id=181
| 1181 Lilith || 1927 CQ || Lili Boulanger (1893–1918), French classical composer || 
|-id=182
| 1182 Ilona || 1927 EA || Unknown origin of name || 
|-id=183
| 1183 Jutta || 1930 DC || Unknown origin of name || 
|-id=184
| 1184 Gaea || 1926 RE || Gaia, Greek goddess || 
|-id=185
| 1185 Nikko || 1927 WC || Nikkō, Tochigi prefecture, Japan || 
|-id=186
| 1186 Turnera || 1929 PL || Herbert Hall Turner (1861–1930), British astronomer || 
|-id=187
| 1187 Afra || 1929 XC || Unknown origin of name || 
|-id=188
| 1188 Gothlandia || 1930 SB || Ancient name of Catalonia || 
|-id=189
| 1189 Terentia || 1930 SG || Lidiya Ivanovna Terenteva (1879–1933), Russian astronomer and orbit computer || 
|-id=190
| 1190 Pelagia || 1930 SL || Pelageya Shajn (1894–1956), Russian astronomer and discoverer of minor planets || 
|-id=191
| 1191 Alfaterna || 1931 CA || Nuceria Alfaterna, ancient city founded by the Oschi, between Pompeii and Salerno, now beneath Nocera Superiore, birthplace of Alfonso Fresa, Italian astronomer, who proposed the name || 
|-id=192
| 1192 Prisma || 1931 FE || The Bergedorfer Spektralkatalog (an astronomical spectral catalogue), as prisms are one method of obtaining spectra || 
|-id=193
| 1193 Africa || 1931 HB || Continent of Africa, in which Johannesburg with its discovering observatory is located || 
|-id=194
| 1194 Aletta || 1931 JG || Wife of discoverer Cyril Jackson || 
|-id=195
| 1195 Orangia || 1931 KD || Orange Province, South Africa, which is now the Free State Province || 
|-id=196
| 1196 Sheba || 1931 KE || Queen of Sheba, Biblical character || 
|-id=197
| 1197 Rhodesia || 1931 LD || Rhodesia, now Zimbabwe || 
|-id=198
| 1198 Atlantis || 1931 RA || Atlantis, mythological land || 
|-id=199
| 1199 Geldonia || 1931 RF || Latin name of Jodoigne, the birthplace of discoverer Eugène Joseph Delporte in Belgium || 
|-id=200
| 1200 Imperatrix || 1931 RH || The Latin word for "Empress" || 
|}

1201–1300 

|-
| 1201 Strenua || 1931 RK || Latin Strenuus, "diligent, careful", virtues exemplified by Gustav Stracke, German astronomer and orbit computer, who had asked that no asteroid be named after him (see ) || 
|-id=202
| 1202 Marina || 1931 RL || Marina Davydovna Lavrova-Berg, who worked at Pulkovo Observatory in 1931–1942 || 
|-id=203
| 1203 Nanna || 1931 TA || Name of many paintings by the German painter Anselm Feuerbach, one of which was in the possession of the discoverer's family || 
|-id=204
| 1204 Renzia || 1931 TE || Franz Robert Renz (1860–1942), German-Russian astronomer || 
|-id=205
| 1205 Ebella ||  || Carl Wilhelm Ludwig Martin Ebell (1871–1944), German astronomer at Kiel Observatory  || 
|-id=206
| 1206 Numerowia || 1931 UH || Boris Numerov (1891–1941), Russian astronomer || 
|-id=207
| 1207 Ostenia || 1931 VT || Hans Osten, German amateur astronomer || 
|-id=208
| 1208 Troilus || 1931 YA || Troilus, Trojan prince, killed by Achilles || 
|-id=209
| 1209 Pumma || 1927 HA || Pumma, nickname of a niece of German astronomer Albrecht Kahrstedt (1897–1971), also see  || 
|-id=210
| 1210 Morosovia || 1931 LB || Nikolai Alexandrovich Morozov (1854–1946), Russian revolutionary || 
|-id=211
| 1211 Bressole || 1931 XA || Bressole, nephew of discoverer Louis Boyer || 
|-id=212
| 1212 Francette || 1931 XC || Francette, wife of discoverer Louis Boyer || 
|-id=213
| 1213 Algeria || 1931 XD || Algeria || 
|-id=214
| 1214 Richilde || 1932 AA || Unknown origin of name || 
|-id=215
| 1215 Boyer || 1932 BA || Louis Boyer (1901–1999), French astronomer and discoverer of minor planets || 
|-id=216
| 1216 Askania || 1932 BL || The "Askania-Werke", German optical and precision instrument makers || 
|-id=217
| 1217 Maximiliana || 1932 EC || Max Wolf (1863–1932), German astronomer || 
|-id=218
| 1218 Aster || 1932 BJ || Aster, a genus of Asteraceae flowering plants || 
|-id=219
| 1219 Britta || 1932 CJ || Unknown origin of name || 
|-id=220
| 1220 Crocus || 1932 CU || Crocus, a genus of Iridaceae flowering plants (possibly inspired by the provisional designation letters: Crocus) || 
|-id=221
| 1221 Amor ||  || Amor, Roman god of love (the minor planet makes close approaches to Earth, like a lover) || 
|-id=222
| 1222 Tina || 1932 LA || Amateur astronomer and friend of the discoverer || 
|-id=223
| 1223 Neckar || 1931 TG || Neckar River, Germany, tributary of the Rhine || 
|-id=224
| 1224 Fantasia || 1927 SD || The Latin word for fantasy || 
|-id=225
| 1225 Ariane || 1930 HK || Ariane Leprieur, leading character of Gabriel Marcel's play Le Chemin de crête || 
|-id=226
| 1226 Golia || 1930 HL || Jacobus Golius (1596–1667), Dutch orientalist who held the chair of Arabic, founder of the Sterrewacht Leiden (Leiden Observatory), who succeeded Willebrord Snell in the chair of Mathematics and Astronomy at the University of Leiden || 
|-id=227
| 1227 Geranium || 1931 TD || Geranium, a genus of Geraniaceae flowering plants. The initials of the minor planets 1227 through 1234, all discovered by K. Reinmuth, spell out "G. Stracke", German astronomer and orbit computer, who had asked that no planet be named after him. || 
|-id=228
| 1228 Scabiosa || 1931 TU || Scabiosa, a genus of Dipsacaceae flowering plants || 
|-id=229
| 1229 Tilia ||  || Tilia, the linden and lime trees || 
|-id=230
| 1230 Riceia ||  || Hugh Rice, American amateur astronomer from New York || 
|-id=231
| 1231 Auricula ||  || Primula auricula, flowering plants || 
|-id=232
| 1232 Cortusa ||  || Cortusa, a genus of Primulaceae flowering plants || 
|-id=233
| 1233 Kobresia ||  || Kobresia, a genus of Cyperaceae plants (sedges) || 
|-id=234
| 1234 Elyna || 1931 UF || Elyna, a genus of Cyperaceae plants (sedges) || 
|-id=235
| 1235 Schorria || 1931 UJ || Richard Schorr (1867–1951), German astronomer || 
|-id=236
| 1236 Thaïs || 1931 VX || Thaïs, an ancient Greek hetaera, who accompanied Alexander the Great (356–323 BC) during his campaigns || 
|-id=237
| 1237 Geneviève || 1931 XB || Eldest daughter of discoverer || 
|-id=238
| 1238 Predappia || 1932 CA || Predappio, Italy, birthplace of Benito Mussolini || 
|-id=239
| 1239 Queteleta || 1932 CB || Adolphe Quetelet (1796–1874), Belgian mathematician, statistician, meteorologist, and astronomer, first director of the Royal Observatory of Belgium at Brussels || 
|-id=240
| 1240 Centenaria || 1932 CD || In honour of the 100th anniversary of Hamburg Observatory || 
|-id=241
| 1241 Dysona ||  || Frank Watson Dyson (1868–1939), British astronomer, director of Greenwich Observatory and president of the IAU 1928–1932 || 
|-id=242
| 1242 Zambesia || 1932 HL || Then-British territories of the Zambezi River Basin, Africa || 
|-id=243
| 1243 Pamela || 1932 JE || Pamela, daughter of astronomer Cyril Jackson who discovered this minor planet || 
|-id=244
| 1244 Deira || 1932 KE || Ancient name of Ossett, Yorkshire, the discoverer's birthplace (An exaggeration; in actuality, the ancient Kingdom of Deira encompassed most of modern Yorkshire) || 
|-id=245
| 1245 Calvinia || 1932 KF || Calvinia, Cape Province, South Africa || 
|-id=246
| 1246 Chaka || 1932 OA || Shaka (c. 1787–1828), king of the Zulus || 
|-id=247
| 1247 Memoria || 1932 QA || Latin for "remembrance"; the discoverer was often reminded of her pleasant relationship while in Uccle in 1932 || 
|-id=248
| 1248 Jugurtha || 1932 RO || Jugurtha (c. 160–104 BC), Numidian king and enemy of Rome || 
|-id=249
| 1249 Rutherfordia || 1932 VB || The city of Rutherford, New Jersey, which is an inner suburb of metropolitan New York City. The naming was proposed by Irving Meyer and endorsed by German astronomer Gustav Stracke who mentioned on a postcard in February 1937, that his American college, Meyer, who himself did not discover any asteroids, requested the naming after the city of Rutherford, where a private observatory was located at the time. The name is often incorrectly attributed to physicist and Nobelist Lord Rutherford || 
|-id=250
| 1250 Galanthus || 1933 BD || Galanthus, the snowdrop || 
|-id=251
| 1251 Hedera || 1933 BE || Hedera, the ivy || 
|-id=252
| 1252 Celestia || 1933 DG || Celestia Whipple, mother of discoverer || 
|-id=253
| 1253 Frisia ||  || Possibly the Latin name for Friesland and the teutonic tribe that gave its name to the area || 
|-id=254
| 1254 Erfordia || 1932 JA || Erfurt, Germany, birthplace of the discoverer || 
|-id=255
| 1255 Schilowa || 1932 NC || Mariya Vasilyevna Zhilova (1870–1934), also known as M. W. Shilowa, Russian astronomer and orbit computer || 
|-id=256
| 1256 Normannia || 1932 PD || "Possibly named for the inhabitants of Normandy" || 
|-id=257
| 1257 Móra || 1932 PE || Károly Móra (1899–1938, also called Károly Mórawetz), Hungarian astronomer, who succeeded Antal Tass as director of the Konkoly Observatory || 
|-id=258
| 1258 Sicilia || 1932 PG || Sicily, Italy || 
|-id=259
| 1259 Ógyalla || 1933 BT || Ógyalla, in Hungary, site of the Konkoly Observatory, then also called the Ógyalla Observatory || 
|-id=260
| 1260 Walhalla || 1933 BW || Walhalla Memorial Hall, near Regensburg, Germany || 
|-id=261
| 1261 Legia || 1933 FB || Latin for Liège, Belgium || 
|-id=262
| 1262 Sniadeckia || 1933 FE || Jan Śniadecki (1756–1830), Polish scholar, professor of mathematics and astronomy, founder of the Kraków Observatory  || 
|-id=263
| 1263 Varsavia || 1933 FF || Latin name of Warsaw, capital of Poland || 
|-id=264
| 1264 Letaba || 1933 HG || Letaba River, Transvaal, South Africa || 
|-id=265
| 1265 Schweikarda || 1911 MV || Maiden name (Schweikard) of discoverer's mother || 
|-id=266
| 1266 Tone || 1927 BD || Tone River, Kantō region, largest river of Japan || 
|-id=267
| 1267 Geertruida || 1930 HD || Geertruida, sister of Dutch astronomer Gerrit Pels at Leiden Observatory, who named this asteroid and computed its orbit || 
|-id=268
| 1268 Libya || 1930 HJ || Libya, country in northern Africa bordering the Mediterranean sea || 
|-id=269
| 1269 Rollandia || 1930 SH || Romain Rolland (1866–1944), French writer || 
|-id=270
| 1270 Datura || 1930 YE || Datura stramonium, the thorn apple || 
|-id=271
| 1271 Isergina || 1931 TN || Pyotr Vasilyevich Isergin, doctor, a friend of the discoverer (who was treated by him) || 
|-id=272
| 1272 Gefion ||  || Gefjun (Gefion) Fountain, Copenhagen, Denmark || 
|-id=273
| 1273 Helma || 1932 PF || Helma, an acquaintance of German astronomer W. Schaub || 
|-id=274
| 1274 Delportia || 1932 WC || Eugène Delporte (1882–1955), Belgian astronomer and discoverer of minor planets || 
|-id=275
| 1275 Cimbria || 1932 WG || The Cimbrians, encountered by the Romans in Noricum, 2nd century BC || 
|-id=276
| 1276 Ucclia || 1933 BA || Named for the city of Uccle and for the Royal Observatory of Belgium situated there || 
|-id=277
| 1277 Dolores || 1933 HA || Dolores Ibárruri (1895–1989), Spanish political leader || 
|-id=278
| 1278 Kenya || 1933 LA || Kenya, African country || 
|-id=279
| 1279 Uganda || 1933 LB || Uganda, African country || 
|-id=280
| 1280 Baillauda || 1933 QB || Jules Baillaud (1876–1960), French astronomer || 
|-id=281
| 1281 Jeanne || 1933 QJ || Jeanne, daughter of discoverer Sylvain Arend || 
|-id=282
| 1282 Utopia ||  || Utopia, mythical place || 
|-id=283
| 1283 Komsomolia || 1925 SC || Komsomol, the Soviet youth organization || 
|-id=284
| 1284 Latvia || 1933 OP || Latvia, country in the Baltic region of Northern Europe || 
|-id=285
| 1285 Julietta || 1933 QF || Julietta, mother of discoverer Eugène Joseph Delporte || 
|-id=286
| 1286 Banachiewicza || 1933 QH || Tadeusz Banachiewicz (1882–1954), Polish astronomer, director of the Kraków Observatory || 
|-id=287
| 1287 Lorcia || 1933 QL || Lorcia, wife of Polish astronomer Tadeusz Banachiewicz || 
|-id=288
| 1288 Santa || 1933 QM || Santa, unknown origin of name. The name was given by Italian astronomer E. de Caro, who computed this asteroid's orbit || 
|-id=289
| 1289 Kutaïssi || 1933 QR || Kutaïssi, city in the Republic of Georgia || 
|-id=290
| 1290 Albertine ||  || Albert I of Belgium (1875–1934), King of Belgium, who died shortly after the asteroid's discovery || 
|-id=291
| 1291 Phryne || 1933 RA || Phryne, a hetaera of the 4th century BC, celebrated for her beauty || 
|-id=292
| 1292 Luce || 1933 SH || Luce, wife of discoverer Fernand Rigaux || 
|-id=293
| 1293 Sonja || 1933 SO || Sonja, unknown origin of name. The name was proposed by ARI and may be inspired by the asteroids provisional designation containing "SO". || 
|-id=294
| 1294 Antwerpia ||  || Antwerp, Belgium || 
|-id=295
| 1295 Deflotte || 1933 WD || Deflotte, nephew of discoverer Louis Boyer || 
|-id=296
| 1296 Andrée || 1933 WE || Andrée, niece of discoverer Louis Boyer || 
|-id=297
| 1297 Quadea || 1934 AD || Parents-in-law of E. Reinmuth, brother of discoverer Karl Reinmuth || 
|-id=298
| 1298 Nocturna || 1934 AE || "Nocturna" is the feminine adjective of "nocturnus", "nightly" || 
|-id=299
| 1299 Mertona || 1934 BA || Gerald Merton (1893–1983), English astronomer || 
|-id=300
| 1300 Marcelle || 1934 CL || Marcelle, the second daughter of French astronomer Guy Reiss who discovered this minor planet || 
|}

1301–1400 

|-
| 1301 Yvonne || 1934 EA || Yvonne Boyer, sister of discoverer Louis Boyer || 
|-id=302
| 1302 Werra || 1924 SV || Werra River, Germany || 
|-id=303
| 1303 Luthera || 1928 FP || Robert Luther (1822–1900), German astronomer and discoverer of minor planets || 
|-id=304
| 1304 Arosa || 1928 KC || Arosa, mountain village and tourist resort in Switzerland || 
|-id=305
| 1305 Pongola || 192148 OC || Pongola River, South Africa || 
|-id=306
| 1306 Scythia || 1930 OB || Scythia, ancient Russian region || 
|-id=307
| 1307 Cimmeria || 1930 UF || Cimmeria, ancient Ukrainian region around Crimea || 
|-id=308
| 1308 Halleria || 1931 EB || Albrecht von Haller (1708–1777), Swiss physician, botanist and poet || 
|-id=309
| 1309 Hyperborea || 1931 TO || Hyperborea, mythical land || 
|-id=310
| 1310 Villigera || 1932 DB || Walter A. Villiger (1872–1938), Swiss astronomer, head of the department of astronomical instruments of Carl Zeiss, Jena || 
|-id=311
| 1311 Knopfia ||  || Otto Knopf (1856–1945), German astronomer at Jena, Germany || 
|-id=312
| 1312 Vassar || 1933 OT || Vassar College, where the orbit computer (American astronomer Maud Worcester Makemson) taught || 
|-id=313
| 1313 Berna || 1933 QG || Bern, capital of Switzerland, named at the request of Sigmund Mauderli, the orbit's computer || 
|-id=314
| 1314 Paula || 1933 SC || Paula, wife of Belgian astronomer Sylvain Arend who discovered this minor planet || 
|-id=315
| 1315 Bronislawa ||  || Bronisław Markiewicz (1842–1912) a Polish Roman Catholic priest || 
|-id=316
| 1316 Kasan || 1933 WC || Kazan, Russia, on the Volga || 
|-id=317
| 1317 Silvretta || 1935 RC || Silvretta, a mountain range in the Alps || 
|-id=318
| 1318 Nerina || 1934 FG || Nerine, a genus of Amaryllidaceae flowering plants || 
|-id=319
| 1319 Disa || 1934 FO || The showy, large tropical terrestrial orchid genus Disa || 
|-id=320
| 1320 Impala || 1934 JG || The impala antelope || 
|-id=321
| 1321 Majuba || 1934 JH || Amajuba, a mountain in northern Natal, part of the Drakensberg range, South Africa, site of the Battle of Majuba Hill || 
|-id=322
| 1322 Coppernicus || 1934 LA || Nicolaus Copernicus (1473–1543), Polish astronomer || 
|-id=323
| 1323 Tugela || 1934 LD || Tugela River, Natal, South Africa || 
|-id=324
| 1324 Knysna || 1934 LL || Knysna, town in the Western Cape Province of South Africa || 
|-id=325
| 1325 Inanda || 1934 NR || Inanda, Zulu village in South Africa || 
|-id=326
| 1326 Losaka || 1934 NS || Lusaka, Zambia (then North Rhodesia) || 
|-id=327
| 1327 Namaqua || 1934 RT || Namaqua, coastal region of South-West Africa || 
|-id=328
| 1328 Devota || 1925 UA || Fortunato Devoto, Argentine astronomer, director of the La Plata Observatory and president of the National Council of Observatories of Argentina. He was a friend of the discoverer Benjamin Jekhowsky || 
|-id=329
| 1329 Eliane || 1933 FL || Éliane, daughter of Paul Bourgeois, Belgian astronomer || 
|-id=330
| 1330 Spiridonia || 1925 DB || Spiridon Zaslavsky (1883–1942), brother-in-law of Russian discoverer Vladimir Albitsky || 
|-id=331
| 1331 Solvejg || 1933 QS || Character in Peer Gynt, drama by Norwegian playwright Henrik Ibsen || 
|-id=332
| 1332 Marconia || 1934 AA || Guglielmo Marconi (1874–1937), Italian radio pioneer, physicist, and Nobel Prize winner || 
|-id=333
| 1333 Cevenola || 1934 DA || The Cévennes, mountainous region of southern France || 
|-id=334
| 1334 Lundmarka || 1934 OB || Knut Lundmark (1889–1958), Swedish astronomer || 
|-id=335
| 1335 Demoulina || 1934 RE || Prof. Demoulin, Belgian astronomer, of the University of Ghent || 
|-id=336
| 1336 Zeelandia || 1934 RW || Latin name for Zeeland, in the Southwest Netherlands || 
|-id=337
| 1337 Gerarda ||  || Gerarda Pels, wife of Dutch astronomer Gerrit Pels, who was a computational assistant at Leiden Observatory || 
|-id=338
| 1338 Duponta || 1934 XA || Marc Dupont, nephew of the discoverer Louis Boyer || 
|-id=339
| 1339 Désagneauxa || 1934 XB || Brother-in-law of the discoverer Louis Boyer || 
|-id=340
| 1340 Yvette || 1934 YA || Yvette, niece of the discoverer Louis Boyer || 
|-id=341
| 1341 Edmée || 1935 BA || Édmée Chandon (1885–1944), French astronomer || 
|-id=342
| 1342 Brabantia || 1935 CV || Latin name of the province of Brabant, Belgium and The Netherlands, whose capital is Brussels || 
|-id=343
| 1343 Nicole || 1935 FC || Niece of the discoverer || 
|-id=344
| 1344 Caubeta || 1935 GA || Paul Caubet, French astronomer at the Toulouse Observatory || 
|-id=345
| 1345 Potomac || 1908 CG || Potomac River, USA || 
|-id=346
| 1346 Gotha || 1929 CY || Gotha, Thuringia, Germany, location of the old Gotha Observatory (Sternwarte Gotha or Seeberg-Sternwarte) established by Duke Ernst I of Saxe-Coburg and whose first director was Franz Xaver von Zach || 
|-id=347
| 1347 Patria || 1931 VW || Latin for "fatherland" || 
|-id=348
| 1348 Michel || 1933 FD || Michel Arend, older son of the discoverer || 
|-id=349
| 1349 Bechuana || 1934 LJ || Bechuana Province of central South Africa, which became Bechuanaland, then Botswana || 
|-id=350
| 1350 Rosselia || 1934 TA || Marie-Thérèse Rossel (1910–1987), editor of the Belgian newspaper Le Soir (1946+) || 
|-id=351
| 1351 Uzbekistania || 1934 TF || Uzbekistan, then the Uzbek Soviet Socialist Republic, where the discoverer resided; the name was found posthumously, handwritten in the discoverer's personal copy of Kleine Planeten für 1941 || 
|-id=352
| 1352 Wawel || 1935 CE || Wawel Castle, Kraków, Poland, also seat of the Wawel Cathedral || 
|-id=353
| 1353 Maartje || 1935 CU || Maartje Mekking (1924–2007), daughter of B. G. Mekking (1903–1971), a Dutch computational assistant at Leiden Observatory || 
|-id=354
| 1354 Botha || 1935 GK || Louis Botha (1862–1919), first prime minister of the Union of South Africa || 
|-id=355
| 1355 Magoeba || 1935 HE || Magoeba, native chief of the North Transvaal, South Africa || 
|-id=356
| 1356 Nyanza || 1935 JH || Nyanza Province, Kenya || 
|-id=357
| 1357 Khama || 1935 ND || Khama III (c. 1837–1923), king of the Bechuana in South Africa || 
|-id=358
| 1358 Gaika || 1935 OB || Ngqika (a.k.a. Gaika), Xhosa chief of Transkei, South Africa (then British Kaffraria) || 
|-id=359
| 1359 Prieska || 1935 OC || Prieska village, Cape Province, South Africa || 
|-id=360
| 1360 Tarka || 1935 OD || Tarka, chief of Transkei, South Africa, who also gave his name to the town of Tarkastad || 
|-id=361
| 1361 Leuschneria || 1935 QA || Armin Otto Leuschner (1868–1953), American astronomer, head of the Department of Astronomy of the University of California at Berkeley || 
|-id=362
| 1362 Griqua ||  || Griqua tribe of Griqualand, South Africa || 
|-id=363
| 1363 Herberta || 1935 RA || Herbert Hoover (1874–1964), American president, earlier president of the Commission for Relief in Belgium (1915–1919); named in his honour after his 1938 visit to Belgium || 
|-id=364
| 1364 Safara || 1935 VB || André Safar of Algiers || 
|-id=365
| 1365 Henyey || 1928 RK || Louis G. Henyey (1910–1970), American astronomer || 
|-id=366
| 1366 Piccolo || 1932 WA || Auguste Cauvin, a.k.a. d'Arsac, editor-in-chief of the Brussels newspaper Le Soir (c. 1898 – 1937). "Piccolo" means "small" in Italian and was his pseudonym. || 
|-id=367
| 1367 Nongoma || 1934 NA || Nongoma, capital city of the KwaZulu homeland, South Africa || 
|-id=368
| 1368 Numidia || 1935 HD || Numidia, ancient North African kingdom and Roman province || 
|-id=369
| 1369 Ostanina || 1935 QB || Ostanin, a small village in located in the Solikamsky District of the Perm Governorate, what is now Russia || 
|-id=370
| 1370 Hella || 1935 QG || Helene Nowacki (1904–1972), a German astronomer at ARI || 
|-id=371
| 1371 Resi || 1935 QJ || Cousin of Mrs. Schaub, acquaintance of the discoverer || 
|-id=372
| 1372 Haremari || 1935 QK || In honour of all the women who worked at the Astronomisches Rechen-Institut: "Harem ARI" || 
|-id=373
| 1373 Cincinnati || 1935 QN || Cincinnati Observatory, whose staff did most of the orbit computations || 
|-id=374
| 1374 Isora || 1935 UA || Female name "Rosi" spelled backwards. The name was chosen by German astronomer Gustav Stracke. || 
|-id=375
| 1375 Alfreda || 1935 UB || Alfreda, a friend of the discoverer Eugène Delporte || 
|-id=376
| 1376 Michelle || 1935 UH || Michelle Boyer, third daughter of the discoverer Louis Boyer || 
|-id=377
| 1377 Roberbauxa || 1936 CD || Robert Baux (1900–1987), French engineer, childhood friend of the discoverer || 
|-id=378
| 1378 Leonce || 1936 DB || Léonce Rigaux, father of the discoverer || 
|-id=379
| 1379 Lomonosowa || 1936 FC || Mikhail Lomonosov (1711–1765), Russian polymath || 
|-id=380
| 1380 Volodia || 1936 FM || Vladimir Vesselovsky (born 1936), born the night of the asteroid's discovery (Volodya is a diminutive of Vladimir) || 
|-id=381
| 1381 Danubia || 1930 QJ || Danube River || 
|-id=382
| 1382 Gerti || 1925 BB || Gertrud Höhne (or Hoehne), secretary at the Astronomisches Rechen-Institut in Berlin, Germany || 
|-id=383
| 1383 Limburgia || 1934 RV || Latin name for the province of Limburg || 
|-id=384
| 1384 Kniertje || 1934 RX || "Kniertje" is the main character in the drama Op Hoop van Zegen by Dutch journalist and dramatist Herman Heijermans || 
|-id=385
| 1385 Gelria || 1935 MJ || "Gelria", Latin name for the Dutch province of Gelderland || 
|-id=386
| 1386 Storeria || 1935 PA || Norman Wyman Storer, American professor of astronomy at the University of Kansas, teacher to the orbit computer || 
|-id=387
| 1387 Kama || 1935 QD || Kama River, tributary to the Volga, east of Kazan || 
|-id=388
| 1388 Aphrodite || 1935 SS || Aphrodite, Greek goddess || 
|-id=389
| 1389 Onnie ||  || A. Kruyt, sister-in-law of Dutch astronomer Gerrit Pels, who was a computational assistant at Leiden Observatory || 
|-id=390
| 1390 Abastumani || 1935 TA || Abastumani, city in the Republic of Georgia and location of the Georgian National Astrophysical Observatory (Abastumani Observatory) || 
|-id=391
| 1391 Carelia || 1936 DA || Latin name of Karelia, Finland || 
|-id=392
| 1392 Pierre || 1936 FO || Nephew of discoverer || 
|-id=393
| 1393 Sofala || 1936 KD || Sofala Province, Mozambique || 
|-id=394
| 1394 Algoa || 1936 LK || Algoa Bay, South Africa || 
|-id=395
| 1395 Aribeda || 1936 OB || Abbreviation of Astronomisches Rechen-Institut, Berlin Dahlem || 
|-id=396
| 1396 Outeniqua || 1936 PF || Outeniqua Mountains, in south western Cape Province, South Africa || 
|-id=397
| 1397 Umtata || 1936 PG || Umtata, capital of Transkei, South Africa || 
|-id=398
| 1398 Donnera || 1936 QL || Anders Donner (1854–1938), Finnish astronomer, director of the Helsinki Observatory || 
|-id=399
| 1399 Teneriffa || 1936 QY || Tenerife, Canary Islands || 
|-id=400
| 1400 Tirela || 1936 WA || Charles Tirel, friend of the discoverer Louis Boyer || 
|}

1401–1500 

|-
| 1401 Lavonne || 1935 UD || Lavonne, granddaughter of American astronomer Maud Worcester Makemson (1891–1977), who computed the asteroid's orbit || 
|-id=402
| 1402 Eri || 1936 OC || Erika Schattschneider-Kollnig (1913–1978), German astronomer at Heidelberg Observatory || 
|-id=403
| 1403 Idelsonia || 1936 QA || Naum Idelson (1885–1951), Soviet astronomer at the Pulkovo Observatory || 
|-id=404
| 1404 Ajax || 1936 QW || Ajax, mythological Greek warrior || 
|-id=405
| 1405 Sibelius || 1936 RE || Jean Sibelius (1865–1957), Finnish composer and violinist || 
|-id=406
| 1406 Komppa || 1936 RF || Gustaf Komppa (1867–1949), Finnish chemist known for the industrial synthesis of camphor. He was a chancellor of the University of Turku and co-founder of the Turku Observatory || 
|-id=407
| 1407 Lindelöf || 1936 WC || Ernst Leonard Lindelöf (1870–1946), Finnish mathematician || 
|-id=408
| 1408 Trusanda || 1936 WF || Trude Hichgesand, an acquaintance of Heidelberg astronomer Heinrich Vogt see 1439 Vogtia || 
|-id=409
| 1409 Isko || 1937 AK || Ise Koch, wife of German astronomer Fritz Kubach (1912–1945)(de) || 
|-id=410
| 1410 Margret || 1937 AL || Margret Braun (died 1991), wife of Heinrich Vogt, German astronomer || 
|-id=411
| 1411 Brauna || 1937 AM || Margret Braun (died 1991), wife of Heinrich Vogt, German astronomer || 
|-id=412
| 1412 Lagrula || 1937 BA || Joanny-Philippe Lagrula (1870–1941), French astronomer, at one time director of the Algiers Observatory || 
|-id=413
| 1413 Roucarie || 1937 CD || Roucarie Boyer, mother of French discoverer Louis Boyer || 
|-id=414
| 1414 Jérôme || 1937 CE || Jérôme Boyer, father of French discoverer Louis Boyer || 
|-id=415
| 1415 Malautra || 1937 EA || Malautra Boyer, wife of French discoverer Louis Boyer || 
|-id=416
| 1416 Renauxa || 1937 EC || P. Renaux, a French astronomer who worked as an assistant at the Algiers Observatory || 
|-id=417
| 1417 Walinskia || 1937 GH || Walinskia, an acquaintance of an astronomer at ARI, Berlin || 
|-id=418
| 1418 Fayeta || 1903 RG || Gaston-Jules Fayet (1874–1967), French astronomer and director of the Nice Observatory || 
|-id=419
| 1419 Danzig || 1929 RF || The city of Gdańsk (German: Danzig) in Poland || 
|-id=420
| 1420 Radcliffe || 1931 RJ || Radcliffe College in Cambridge, Massachusetts, in honour of the class of 1912 || 
|-id=421
| 1421 Esperanto || 1936 FQ || The Esperanto language || 
|-id=422
| 1422 Strömgrenia || 1936 QF || Elis Strömgren (1870–1947), Swedish-born Danish astronomer, director of the Copenhagen University Observatory and the Bureau central des télégrammes astronomiques (and father of Bengt Georg Daniel Strömgren, Danish astronomer) || 
|-id=423
| 1423 Jose || 1936 QM || Giuseppina Bianchi, deceased young daughter of Italian astronomer Emilio Bianchi || 
|-id=424
| 1424 Sundmania || 1937 AJ || Karl F. Sundman (1873–1949), Finnish mathematician, then director of the Helsingfors Observatory || 
|-id=425
| 1425 Tuorla || 1937 GB || Tuorla Observatory, Finland, then the Research Institute for Astronomy and Optics || 
|-id=426
| 1426 Riviera || 1937 GF || The French Riviera, on the Mediterranean coast of France and the location of the discovering Nice Observatory || 
|-id=427
| 1427 Ruvuma || 1937 KB || Ruvuma River, Tanzania || 
|-id=428
| 1428 Mombasa || 1937 NO || Mombasa, Kenya || 
|-id=429
| 1429 Pemba || 1937 NH || Pemba Island, Tanzania || 
|-id=430
| 1430 Somalia || 1937 NK || Somalia, a country located in the Horn of Africa || 
|-id=431
| 1431 Luanda || 1937 OB || Luanda, Angola || 
|-id=432
| 1432 Ethiopia || 1937 PG || Ethiopia (then called Abyssinia) and country located in the Horn of Africa || 
|-id=433
| 1433 Geramtina || 1937 UC || Miss Asplind, sister of Swedish astronomer Bror Asplind (1890–1954), see  || 
|-id=434
| 1434 Margot ||  || Gertrud Margot Görsdorf (1915–1990), friend of astronomer Wilhelm Gliese || 
|-id=435
| 1435 Garlena || 1936 WE || Acquaintance of Prof. W. Schaub, German orbit computer || 
|-id=436
| 1436 Salonta || 1936 YA || Salonta, town in what is now Romania, and place of birth of the discoverer, the Hungarian astronomer György Kulin (1905–1989) || 
|-id=437
| 1437 Diomedes || 1937 PB || Diomedes, mythological Greek warrior involved in the Trojan War || 
|-id=438
| 1438 Wendeline || 1937 TC || Unknown origin of name || 
|-id=439
| 1439 Vogtia || 1937 TE || Heinrich Vogt (1890–1968), German astronomer || 
|-id=440
| 1440 Rostia || 1937 TF || Johann Leonhard Rost (1688–1727), German astronomer and author of the Atlas Portatilis Coelistis || 
|-id=441
| 1441 Bolyai || 1937 WA || János Bolyai (1802–1860), Hungarian mathematician || 
|-id=442
| 1442 Corvina || 1937 YF || Matthias Corvinus (1443–1490), King of Hungary. His library, the Bibliotheca Corviniana was second in size and significance to the Vatican library || 
|-id=443
| 1443 Ruppina || 1937 YG || Ruppin, Germany city and birthplace of astronomer Carl Ebell, see 1205 Ebella || 
|-id=444
| 1444 Pannonia || 1938 AE || Pannonia, the ancient Roman province which is largely co-extensive with the modern Transdanubia region in Hungary || 
|-id=445
| 1445 Konkolya || 1938 AF || Nicolaus von Konkoly Thege (Thege Miklós Konkoly; 1842–1916), Hungarian founder of the Ó-Gyalla Observatory, now known as the Hurbanovo Geomagnetic Observatory, Slovakia || 
|-id=446
| 1446 Sillanpää || 1938 BA || Frans Eemil Sillanpää (1888–1964), Finnish author, winner of the 1939 Nobel Prize for Literature || 
|-id=447
| 1447 Utra || 1938 BB || The northeastern Finnish town of Utra, birthplace of the discoverer Yrjö Väisälä || 
|-id=448
| 1448 Lindbladia || 1938 DF || Bertil Lindblad (1895–1965), Swedish astronomer and former IAU president || 
|-id=449
| 1449 Virtanen || 1938 DO || Artturi Ilmari Virtanen (1895–1973), Finnish biochemist, winner of the 1945 Nobel Prize for Chemistry || 
|-id=450
| 1450 Raimonda || 1938 DP || Jean Jacques Raimond (1903–1961), Dutch astronomer and former president of the Royal Dutch Meteorological and Astronomical Society and director of the Zeiss planetarium in The Hague || 
|-id=451
| 1451 Granö || 1938 DT || Johannes Gabriel Granö (1882–1956), Finnish geographer, explorer, and chancellor of Turku University || 
|-id=452
| 1452 Hunnia ||  || Literally, land of the Huns (the state founded by Attila the Hun) but used as a stylistic alternative for Hungary or Magyarország, or as a stylistic synonym for the land lying east of the Danube || 
|-id=453
| 1453 Fennia ||  || Latin name for Finland || 
|-id=454
| 1454 Kalevala || 1936 DO || Kalevala, the Finnish epic poem || 
|-id=455
| 1455 Mitchella || 1937 LF || Maria Mitchell (1818–1889), American astronomer || 
|-id=456
| 1456 Saldanha || 1937 NG || Saldanha harbour, South Africa || 
|-id=457
| 1457 Ankara || 1937 PA || The city of Ankara, capital of Turkey || 
|-id=458
| 1458 Mineura || 1937 RC || Adolphe Mineur, Belgian mathematician and professor at the University of Brussels || 
|-id=459
| 1459 Magnya || 1937 VA || "Magnya", means "clear, bright, wonderful", when translated from Latin to Russian || 
|-id=460
| 1460 Haltia || 1937 WC || Haltitunturi mountain or possibly haltia, Finnish word for elf || 
|-id=461
| 1461 Jean-Jacques || 1937 YL || Jean-Jacques Laugier, son of French discoverer Marguerite Laugier || 
|-id=462
| 1462 Zamenhof || 1938 CA || L. L. Zamenhof (1859–1917), Polish physician and linguist, inventor of Esperanto || 
|-id=463
| 1463 Nordenmarkia || 1938 CB || Nils Viktor Emanuel Nordenmark (1867–1962), Swedish astronomer || 
|-id=464
| 1464 Armisticia || 1939 VO || The Armistice of 11 November 1918 (World War I), on the occasion of its 21st anniversary, in the hope of a continuation of world peace || 
|-id=465
| 1465 Autonoma || 1938 FA || "Autonoma", short for the Universidad Autonoma de El Salvador, in recognition of the hospitality granted to the Hamburg Observatory || 
|-id=466
| 1466 Mündleria || 1938 KA || Max Mündler (1876–1969), German astronomer at Heidelberg Observatory || 
|-id=467
| 1467 Mashona || 1938 OE || Mashona people of Zimbabwe (then Rhodesia) || 
|-id=468
| 1468 Zomba || 1938 PA || The city of Zomba in Malawi (then Nyassaland), Africa || 
|-id=469
| 1469 Linzia || 1938 QD || The city of Linz, Austria || 
|-id=470
| 1470 Carla || 1938 SD || Carla Ziegler, friend of German discoverer Alfred Bohrmann || 
|-id=471
| 1471 Tornio ||  || The city of Tornio, in Lapland, Finland || 
|-id=472
| 1472 Muonio || 1938 UQ || Muonio, town in northern Finland, above the Arctic Circle || 
|-id=473
| 1473 Ounas || 1938 UT || Ounasjoki River in Finland || 
|-id=474
| 1474 Beira || 1935 QY || The city of Beira, Mozambique, in southeast Africa || 
|-id=475
| 1475 Yalta || 1935 SM || The city of Yalta, on south coast of the Crimean Peninsula || 
|-id=476
| 1476 Cox || 1936 RA || Jacques Cox (1898–1972), Belgian astronomer and professor of astronomy at the University of Brussels || 
|-id=477
| 1477 Bonsdorffia || 1938 CC || Ilmari Bonsdorff (1879–1950), Finnish astronomer and founder of the Finnish Geodetic Institute || 
|-id=478
| 1478 Vihuri || 1938 CF || A. Vihuri, Finnish ship owner and patron of the arts and sciences || 
|-id=479
| 1479 Inkeri || 1938 DE || The region of Ingria, now in Russia. "Inkeri" is also the first name of the granddaughter and niece of Finnish discoverer Yrjö Väisälä || 
|-id=480
| 1480 Aunus || 1938 DK || Russian town of Olonets (Finnish: Aunus) in Karelia. It is also named after the grandson of discoverer Yrjö Väisälä || 
|-id=481
| 1481 Tübingia || 1938 DR || The German city of Tübingen, birthplace of astronomer Johannes Kepler || 
|-id=482
| 1482 Sebastiana ||  || Sebastian Finsterwalder, German || 
|-id=483
| 1483 Hakoila ||  || Kosti Johannes Hakoila (1898–), Finnish astronomer and assistant of the discoverer Yrjö Väisälä || 
|-id=484
| 1484 Postrema || 1938 HC || "Postrema" (Latin: "last") for the last discovery made by Grigory Neujmin (this would not remain true) || 
|-id=485
| 1485 Isa || 1938 OB || "Isa", diminutive of the Italian name "Marisa" || 
|-id=486
| 1486 Marilyn || 1938 QA || Marilyn Herget, daughter of Paul Herget, American astronomer || 
|-id=487
| 1487 Boda || 1938 WC || Karl Boda (1889–1942), German astronomer || 
|-id=488
| 1488 Aura || 1938 XE || Aura River, Finland || 
|-id=489
| 1489 Attila || 1939 GC || Attila (c. 406–453), king of the Huns and one of the most feared enemies of the Western and Eastern Roman Empires || 
|-id=490
| 1490 Limpopo || 1936 LB || Limpopo River, Africa || 
|-id=491
| 1491 Balduinus || 1938 EJ || Latin form of the name Baldwin, in this case referring to King Baudouin of Belgium || 
|-id=492
| 1492 Oppolzer || 1938 FL || Theodor von Oppolzer (1841–1886), Austrian astronomer || 
|-id=493
| 1493 Sigrid || 1938 QB || Sigrid Strömgren, wife of Danish-American astronomer Bengt Strömgren || 
|-id=494
| 1494 Savo || 1938 SJ || Savonia, historical province of Finland || 
|-id=495
| 1495 Helsinki || 1938 SW || The city of Helsinki, capital of Finland || 
|-id=496
| 1496 Turku ||  || The city of Turku, Finland, home to the discoverer Yrjö Väisälä || 
|-id=497
| 1497 Tampere ||  || The city of Tampere, Finland || 
|-id=498
| 1498 Lahti ||  || The city of Lahti, Finland || 
|-id=499
| 1499 Pori || 1938 UF || The city of Pori, Finland || 
|-id=500
| 1500 Jyväskylä || 1938 UH || The city of Jyväskylä, Finland || 
|}

1501–1600 

|-
| 1501 Baade || 1938 UJ || Walter Baade (1893–1960), German astronomer || 
|-id=502
| 1502 Arenda || 1938 WB || Sylvain Arend (1902–1992), Belgian astronomer || 
|-id=503
| 1503 Kuopio || 1938 XD || Kuopio, Finland || 
|-id=504
| 1504 Lappeenranta || 1939 FM || Lappeenranta, Finland || 
|-id=505
| 1505 Koranna || 1939 HH || The Koranna, a tribe of San people from the Kalahari Desert || 
|-id=506
| 1506 Xosa || 1939 JC || Xhosa people of Africa || 
|-id=507
| 1507 Vaasa || 1939 RD || Vaasa, Finland || 
|-id=508
| 1508 Kemi || 1938 UP || Kemi, Finland || 
|-id=509
| 1509 Esclangona || 1938 YG || Ernest Esclangon (1876–1954), French astronomer || 
|-id=510
| 1510 Charlois || 1939 DC || Auguste Charlois (1864–1910), French astronomer || 
|-id=511
| 1511 Daléra || 1939 FB || Paul Daléra, friend of discoverer || 
|-id=512
| 1512 Oulu || 1939 FE || Oulu, Finland, birthplace of discoverer || 
|-id=513
| 1513 Mátra || 1940 EB || Mátra, a mountain range in Hungary || 
|-id=514
| 1514 Ricouxa || 1906 UR || Unknown origin of name || 
|-id=515
| 1515 Perrotin || 1936 VG || Joseph Athanase Perrotin (1845–1904), French astronomer || 
|-id=516
| 1516 Henry || 1938 BG || Paul Henry and Prosper Henry (1848–1905 and 1849–1903) French astronomers || 
|-id=517
| 1517 Beograd || 1938 FD || Belgrade, Serbia, discoverer's native city || 
|-id=518
| 1518 Rovaniemi || 1938 UA || Rovaniemi, Finland || 
|-id=519
| 1519 Kajaani || 1938 UB || Kajaani, Finland || 
|-id=520
| 1520 Imatra || 1938 UY || Imatra, Finland || 
|-id=521
| 1521 Seinäjoki ||  || Seinäjoki, Finland || 
|-id=522
| 1522 Kokkola || 1938 WO || Kokkola, Finland || 
|-id=523
| 1523 Pieksämäki || 1939 BC || Pieksämäki, Finland || 
|-id=524
| 1524 Joensuu || 1939 SB || Joensuu, Finland || 
|-id=525
| 1525 Savonlinna || 1939 SC || Savonlinna, Finland || 
|-id=526
| 1526 Mikkeli || 1939 TF || Mikkeli, Finland || 
|-id=527
| 1527 Malmquista || 1939 UG || Gunnar Malmquist (1893–1982), Swedish astronomer || 
|-id=528
| 1528 Conrada || 1940 CA || Fritz Conrad (1883–1944), admiral in the German Navy during World War II || 
|-id=529
| 1529 Oterma || 1938 BC || Liisi Oterma (1915–2001), Finnish astronomer and discoverer of minor planets || 
|-id=530
| 1530 Rantaseppä || 1938 SG || Hilkka Rantaseppä (1925–1975), Finnish astronomer || 
|-id=531
| 1531 Hartmut || 1938 SH || Hartmut Neckel, grandson of discoverer || 
|-id=532
| 1532 Inari || 1938 SM || Lake Inari, Finland || 
|-id=533
| 1533 Saimaa || 1939 BD || Lake Saimaa, Finland || 
|-id=534
| 1534 Näsi || 1939 BK || Lake Näsi, Finland || 
|-id=535
| 1535 Päijänne || 1939 RC || Lake Päijänne, in Päijänne National Park, Finland || 
|-id=536
| 1536 Pielinen || 1939 SE || Lake Pielinen, in Koli National Park, Finland || 
|-id=537
| 1537 Transylvania || 1940 QA || Transylvania, Romania || 
|-id=538
| 1538 Detre || 1940 RF || László Detre (1906–1974), Hungarian astronomer || 
|-id=539
| 1539 Borrelly || 1940 UB || Alphonse Borrelly (1842–1926), French astronomer and discoverer of minor planets || 
|-id=540
| 1540 Kevola || 1938 WK || Kevola, Kevola Observatory in Finland operated by Hilkka Rantaseppä || 
|-id=541
| 1541 Estonia || 1939 CK || Estonia || 
|-id=542
| 1542 Schalén || 1941 QE || Carl Schalén, Swedish astronomer at the Lund Institute of Astronomy || 
|-id=543
| 1543 Bourgeois || 1941 SJ || Paul Bourgeois (1898–1974), Belgian astronomer and discoverer of minor planets || 
|-id=544
| 1544 Vinterhansenia || 1941 UK || Julie Vinter Hansen (1890–1960), Danish astronomer || 
|-id=545
| 1545 Thernöe || 1941 UW || Karl August Thernöe (1911–1987), Danish astronomer at Copenhagen Observatory, popularizer of astronomy, and director of IAU's Central Bureau for Astronomical Telegrams (Src) || 
|-id=546
| 1546 Izsák ||  || Imre Izsák (1929–1965), Hungarian astronomer || 
|-id=547
| 1547 Nele || 1929 CZ || Nele, wife of folk-hero Till Eulenspiegel || 
|-id=548
| 1548 Palomaa || 1935 FK || Matti Herman Palomaa (1871–1947), Finnish chemist at the University of Turku || 
|-id=549
| 1549 Mikko || 1937 GA || Mikko Arthur Levander, Finnish pastor, amateur astronomer, and father-in-law of discoverer || 
|-id=550
| 1550 Tito || 1937 WD || Josip Broz Tito (1892–1980), Yugoslav leader || 
|-id=551
| 1551 Argelander ||  || Friedrich Wilhelm Argelander (1799–1875), German astronomer || 
|-id=552
| 1552 Bessel ||  || Friedrich Bessel (1784–1846), German astronomer and mathematician || 
|-id=553
| 1553 Bauersfelda || 1940 AD || Walther Bauersfeld (1879–1959), German engineer, designer of the Zeiss planetaria || 
|-id=554
| 1554 Yugoslavia || 1940 RE || Socialist Federal Republic of Yugoslavia, discoverer's fatherland || 
|-id=555
| 1555 Dejan || 1941 SA || Dejan Đurković, son of Yugoslav astronomer Petar Đurković (1908–1981) || 
|-id=556
| 1556 Wingolfia || 1942 AA || Wingolf, a fraternity at Heidelberg University || 
|-id=557
| 1557 Roehla || 1942 AD || Lars Ruehl, Swedish-German doctor in Heidelberg, Germany, in gratitude for restoring the discoverer's health || 
|-id=558
| 1558 Järnefelt || 1942 BD || Gustaf J. Järnefelt, Finnish astronomer || 
|-id=559
| 1559 Kustaanheimo || 1942 BF || Paul H. Kustaaheimo, Finnish astronomer at the Helsinki Observatory || 
|-id=560
| 1560 Strattonia || 1942 XB || F. J. M. Stratton (1881–1960), British astronomer || 
|-id=561
| 1561 Fricke || 1941 CG || Walter Fricke, German astronomer and director of ARI in Heidelberg || 
|-id=562
| 1562 Gondolatsch || 1943 EE || Friedrich Gondolatsch, German astronomer at ARI || 
|-id=563
| 1563 Noël || 1943 EG || Emanuel Arend, son of Belgian astronomer Sylvain Arend who discovered this minor planet || 
|-id=564
| 1564 Srbija || 1936 TB || Serbia (first minor planet discovered from Belgrade) || 
|-id=565
| 1565 Lemaître || 1948 WA || Georges Lemaître (1894–1966), Belgian astronomer and Jesuit priest || 
|-id=566
| 1566 Icarus || 1949 MA || Icarus, mythological Greek aeronaut || 
|-id=567
| 1567 Alikoski || 1941 HN || Heikki A. Alikoski (1912–1997), observatory assistant at Turku Observatory in Finland and a discoverer of minor planets || 
|-id=568
| 1568 Aisleen || 1946 QB || Wife of discoverer || 
|-id=569
| 1569 Evita || 1948 PA || Eva Perón (1919–1952), First Lady of Argentina || 
|-id=570
| 1570 Brunonia || 1948 TX || Brown University || 
|-id=571
| 1571 Cesco || 1950 FJ || Ronaldo P. Cesco and Carlos Ulrrico Cesco (died 1987), Argentine astronomers, latter a discoverer of minor planets || 
|-id=572
| 1572 Posnania || 1949 SC || Poznań, Poland || 
|-id=573
| 1573 Väisälä || 1949 UA || Yrjö Väisälä (1891–1971), Finnish astronomer || 
|-id=574
| 1574 Meyer || 1949 FD || G. Meyer, French astronomer || 
|-id=575
| 1575 Winifred || 1950 HH || Winifred Cameron (1918–2016), American planetary geologist || 
|-id=576
| 1576 Fabiola || 1948 SA || Queen Fabiola of Belgium, former Queen of Belgium || 
|-id=577
| 1577 Reiss || 1949 BA || Guy Reiss (1904–1964), French astronomer and discoverer of minor planets || 
|-id=578
| 1578 Kirkwood || 1951 AT || Daniel Kirkwood (1814–1895), American astronomer || 
|-id=579
| 1579 Herrick || 1948 SB || Samuel Herrick (1911–1974), American astronomer and mathematician || 
|-id=580
| 1580 Betulia || 1950 KA || Betulia Herrick, wife of American astronomer Samuel Herrick || 
|-id=581
| 1581 Abanderada ||  || "Abanderada", Spanish for leader carrying a banner, in honour of Eva Perón || 
|-id=582
| 1582 Martir || 1950 LY || "Martir", Spanish for martyr, in honour of Eva Perón || 
|-id=583
| 1583 Antilochus || 1950 SA || Antilochus, mythological Greek warrior || 
|-id=584
| 1584 Fuji || 1927 CR || Mount Fuji, Japan || 
|-id=585
| 1585 Union || 1947 RG || Union Observatory in Johannesburg, South Africa || 
|-id=586
| 1586 Thiele || 1939 CJ || Thorvald N. Thiele (1838–1910), Danish astronomer || 
|-id=587
| 1587 Kahrstedt ||  || Albrecht Kahrstedt (1897–1971), German ARI-astronomer at Heidelberg, computer of minor planet orbits, and later director of the Babelsberg Observatory, Berlin.
|-id=588
| 1588 Descamisada || 1951 MH || "Descamisada", Spanish for shirtless (worker), in honour of Eva Perón || 
|-id=589
| 1589 Fanatica || 1950 RK || "Fanatica", Spanish for fanatical woman, in honour of Eva Perón || 
|-id=590
| 1590 Tsiolkovskaja || 1933 NA || Konstantin Tsiolkovsky (1857–1935), Russian rocket scientist || 
|-id=591
| 1591 Baize || 1951 KA || Paul Baize (1901–1995), French physician and amateur astronomer || 
|-id=592
| 1592 Mathieu || 1951 LA || Mathieu, grandchild of Belgian astronomer Sylvain Arend who discovered this minor planet || 
|-id=593
| 1593 Fagnes || 1951 LB || Hautes Fagnes, plateau in Belgium || 
|-id=594
| 1594 Danjon || 1949 WA || André-Louis Danjon (1890–1967), French astronomer || 
|-id=595
| 1595 Tanga || 1930 ME || Tanga, Tanzania || 
|-id=596
| 1596 Itzigsohn || 1951 EV || Miguel Itzigsohn (1908–1978), Argentinian astronomer and discoverer of minor planets || 
|-id=597
| 1597 Laugier || 1949 EB || Marguerite Laugier (1896–1976), French astronomer and discoverer of minor planets || 
|-id=598
| 1598 Paloque || 1950 CA || Émile Paloque, French astronomer and director of the Toulouse Observatory || 
|-id=599
| 1599 Giomus || 1950 WA || Gien-sur-Loire, France || 
|-id=600
| 1600 Vyssotsky || 1947 UC || Emma Vyssotsky (1894–1975), American astronomer || 
|}

1601–1700 

|-
| 1601 Patry || 1942 KA || André Patry (1902–1960), French astronomer and discoverer of minor planets || 
|-id=602
| 1602 Indiana || 1950 GF || Indiana and Indiana University || 
|-id=603
| 1603 Neva || 1926 VH || Neva, river running through Saint Petersburg, Russia || 
|-id=604
| 1604 Tombaugh || 1931 FH || Clyde Tombaugh (1906–1997), American astronomer and discoverer of minor planets; this asteroid was amongst the numerous asteroids recorded by Tombaugh during the search for Pluto || 
|-id=605
| 1605 Milankovitch || 1936 GA || Milutin Milanković (1879–1958), Serbian astronomer || 
|-id=606
| 1606 Jekhovsky || 1950 RH || Benjamin Jekhowsky (Jekhovsky; 1881–1975), Russian-born French astronomer || 
|-id=607
| 1607 Mavis || 1950 RA || Mavis Bruwer, wife of South African astronomer Jacobus Albertus Bruwer || 
|-id=608
| 1608 Muñoz || 1951 RZ || F. A. Muñoz, assistant astronomer at the La Plata Observatory in Argentina. He was an observer and orbit computer of minor planets, and was involved in the testing of the 2.15-meter Argentine telescope (Jorge Sahade Telescope). || 
|-id=609
| 1609 Brenda || 1951 NL || Granddaughter of discoverer || 
|-id=610
| 1610 Mirnaya || 1928 RT || Russian for "peaceful". Proposed by the Institute of Theoretical Astronomy in St Petersburg || 
|-id=611
| 1611 Beyer || 1950 DJ || Max Beyer (1894–1982), German astronomer at Bergedorf Observatory || 
|-id=612
| 1612 Hirose || 1950 BJ || Hideo Hirose (広瀬秀雄), Japanese astronomer || 
|-id=613
| 1613 Smiley || 1950 SD || Charles Hugh Smiley (1903–1977), American astronomer || 
|-id=614
| 1614 Goldschmidt || 1952 HA || Hermann Goldschmidt (1802–1866), German-French astronomer and discoverer of minor planets || 
|-id=615
| 1615 Bardwell || 1950 BW || Conrad M. Bardwell (1926–2010), American astronomer and research associate with the Minor Planet Center who has made numerous difficult identifications of objects, and has produced numerous reliable ephemerides. The asteroid's named proposed by F. K. Edmondson and Deloris J. Owings. || 
|-id=616
| 1616 Filipoff || 1950 EA || Lionel Filipoff (1893–1940), French astronomer at Paris and Algiers Observatory || 
|-id=617
| 1617 Alschmitt || 1952 FB || Alfred Schmitt (1907–1973), French astronomer and discoverer of minor planets || 
|-id=618
| 1618 Dawn || 1948 NF || Dawn, granddaughter of South African astronomer Ernest Leonard Johnson who discovered this minor planet || 
|-id=619
| 1619 Ueta || 1953 TA || Jo Ueta (上田穣), Japanese astronomer and director of Kwasan Observatory || 
|-id=620
| 1620 Geographos || 1951 RA || National Geographic Society || 
|-id=621
| 1621 Druzhba || 1926 TM || Russian for friendship || 
|-id=622
| 1622 Chacornac || 1952 EA || Jean Chacornac (1823–1873), French astronomer and discoverer of minor planets || 
|-id=623
| 1623 Vivian || 1948 PL || Vivian Hirst, daughter of South African astronomer William Parkinson Hirst || 
|-id=624
| 1624 Rabe ||  || Eugene Rabe (1911–1974), German astronomer || 
|-id=625
| 1625 The NORC || 1953 RB || NORC (Naval Ordnance Research Calculator) || 
|-id=626
| 1626 Sadeya || 1927 AA || The "Spanish and American Astronomical Society", acronym: S.A.D.E.Y.A. (Sociedad Astronómica de España y America), of which Josep Comas i Solà was its first president (Src). || 
|-id=627
| 1627 Ivar || 1929 SH || Late brother of discoverer || 
|-id=628
| 1628 Strobel || 1923 OG || Willi Strobel, German ARI-astronomer || 
|-id=629
| 1629 Pecker || 1952 DB || Jean-Claude Pecker (1923–2020), French astronomer || 
|-id=630
| 1630 Milet || 1952 DA || Bernard Milet, French astronomer at Nice Observatory || 
|-id=631
| 1631 Kopff || 1936 UC || August Kopff (1882–1960), German astronomer and discoverer of minor planets || 
|-id=632
| 1632 Sieböhme || 1941 DF || Siegfried Böhme, German ARI-astronomer || 
|-id=633
| 1633 Chimay || 1929 EC || Chimay, Belgium || 
|-id=634
| 1634 Ndola || 1935 QP || Ndola, Zambia || 
|-id=635
| 1635 Bohrmann || 1924 QW || Alfred Bohrmann (1904–2000), German astronomer and discoverer of minor planets || 
|-id=636
| 1636 Porter || 1950 BH || Jermain Gildersleeve Porter (1852–1933), American astronomer and director of the Cincinnati Observatory, as well as for John Guy Porter (1900–1981), British astronomer at HM Nautical Almanac Office and orbit computer with the British Astronomical Association (Src). || 
|-id=637
| 1637 Swings || 1936 QO || Pol Swings (1906–1983), Belgian astronomer || 
|-id=638
| 1638 Ruanda || 1935 JF || Ruanda-Urundi || 
|-id=639
| 1639 Bower || 1951 RB || Ernest Clare Bower, American mathematician and astronomer (Pluto's orbit) || 
|-id=640
| 1640 Nemo || 1951 QA || Captain Nemo, fictional character || 
|-id=641
| 1641 Tana || 1935 OJ || Tana River in Kenya || 
|-id=642
| 1642 Hill || 1951 RU || George William Hill (1838–1914), American mathematician and astronomer || 
|-id=643
| 1643 Brown || 1951 RQ || Ernest William Brown (1866–1938), British astronomer || 
|-id=644
| 1644 Rafita || 1935 YA || Late son of discoverer || 
|-id=645
| 1645 Waterfield || 1933 OJ || Reginald Lawson Waterfield (1900–1986) and William Francis Herschel Waterfield (1886–1933), British astronomers || 
|-id=646
| 1646 Rosseland || 1939 BG || Svein Rosseland (1894–1985), Norwegian astrophysicist || 
|-id=647
| 1647 Menelaus || 1957 MK || Menelaus, mythological Greek king || 
|-id=648
| 1648 Shajna || 1935 RF || Grigory Shajn (1892–1956), Russian astronomer and discoverer of minor planets, husband of the discoverer Pelageya Shajn || 
|-id=649
| 1649 Fabre || 1951 DE || Hervé Fabre, French astronomer at the Nice Observatory || 
|-id=650
| 1650 Heckmann || 1937 TG || Otto Heckmann (1901–1983), German astronomer || 
|-id=651
| 1651 Behrens || 1936 HD || Johann Gerhard Behrens (1889–1978), German astronomer, orbit computer and pastor at Detern in Lower Saxony, Germany || 
|-id=652
| 1652 Hergé || 1953 PA || Hergé (1907–1983), Belgian cartoonist best known for creating The Adventures of Tintin || 
|-id=653
| 1653 Yakhontovia || 1937 RA || N. S. Yakhontova, husband of Nataliya Yakhontova, Russian astronomer and long-time head of the Minor Planet Department of the Institute of Theoretical Astronomy (ITA) in St Petersburg, Russia || 
|-id=654
| 1654 Bojeva || 1931 TL || Nina Fedorovna Bojeva (1890–1956), Russian astronomer || 
|-id=655
| 1655 Comas Solà || 1929 WG || Josep Comas i Solà, Catalan astronomer and discoverer of minor planets || 
|-id=656
| 1656 Suomi || 1942 EC || Native name for the country of Finland || 
|-id=657
| 1657 Roemera || 1961 EA || Elizabeth Roemer (1929–2016), American astronomer || 
|-id=658
| 1658 Innes || 1953 NA || Robert T. A. Innes (1861–1933), Scottish amateur-turned-professional astronomer and first director of the Transvaal (afterwards Union) Observatory || 
|-id=659
| 1659 Punkaharju || 1940 YL || Punkaharju, Finland || 
|-id=660
| 1660 Wood || 1953 GA || Harry Edwin Wood, South African astronomer || 
|-id=661
| 1661 Granule || A916 FA || Edward A. Gall, pathologist known for the lymphocyte feature Gall's granule or "Gall body" || 
|-id=662
| 1662 Hoffmann || A923 RB || Irmtraud Hoffmann, daughter-in-law of discoverer || 
|-id=663
| 1663 van den Bos || 1926 PE || Willem Hendrik van den Bos (1896–1974), Dutch–South African astronomer || 
|-id=664
| 1664 Felix || 1929 CD || Felix Timmermans (1886–1947), Belgian writer || 
|-id=665
| 1665 Gaby || 1930 DQ || Gaby Reinmuth, daughter-in-law of discoverer || 
|-id=666
| 1666 van Gent || 1930 OG || Hendrik van Gent (1899–1947), Dutch astronomer and discoverer of minor planets || 
|-id=667
| 1667 Pels || 1930 SY || G. Pels, computational assistant at Leiden Observatory || 
|-id=668
| 1668 Hanna || 1933 OK || Hanna Reinmuth, daughter-in-law of discoverer || 
|-id=669
| 1669 Dagmar || 1934 RS || Dagmar, female given name || 
|-id=670
| 1670 Minnaert || 1934 RZ || Marcel Minnaert (1893–1970), Belgian-born Dutch astronomer || 
|-id=671
| 1671 Chaika || 1934 TD || Russian for seagull, in honour of Valentina Tereshkova || 
|-id=672
| 1672 Gezelle || 1935 BD || Guido Gezelle (1830–1899), Flemish poet and a Roman Catholic priest || 
|-id=673
| 1673 van Houten || 1937 TH || Cornelis Johannes van Houten (1920–2002), Dutch astronomer and discoverer of minor planets || 
|-id=674
| 1674 Groeneveld || 1938 DS || Ingrid van Houten-Groeneveld (1921–2015), Dutch astronomer and discoverer of minor planets || 
|-id=675
| 1675 Simonida || 1938 FB || A gracious Serbian Queen Simonida from the Middle Ages || 
|-id=676
| 1676 Kariba || 1939 LC || Kariba Lake, Zambia/Zimbabwe || 
|-id=677
| 1677 Tycho Brahe || 1940 RO || Tycho Brahe (1546–1601), Danish astronomer || 
|-id=678
| 1678 Hveen || 1940 YH || Hven (Hveen), island in Øresund with Tycho Brahe's castle Uraniborg and observatory Stjerneborg || 
|-id=679
| 1679 Nevanlinna || 1941 FR || Rolf Nevanlinna (1895–1980), Finnish mathematician || 
|-id=680
| 1680 Per Brahe || 1942 CH || Per Brahe the Younger (1602–1680), governor-general of Finland || 
|-id=681
| 1681 Steinmetz || 1948 WE || Julius Steinmetz (1893–1965), German pastor and orbit computer || 
|-id=682
| 1682 Karel || 1949 PH || Karel, son of Dutch astronomers Ingrid and Cornelis van Houten || 
|-id=683
| 1683 Castafiore || 1950 SL || Bianca Castafiore, cartoon character (Tintin), opera singer || 
|-id=684
| 1684 Iguassú || 1951 QE || Iguazu Falls, on the Iguazu River, Brazil/Argentina || 
|-id=685
| 1685 Toro || 1948 OA || Toro, maiden name of astronomer Samuel Herrick's wife || 
|-id=686
| 1686 De Sitter ||  || Willem de Sitter (1872–1934), Dutch astronomer || 
|-id=687
| 1687 Glarona || 1965 SC || Canton of Glarus, Switzerland || 
|-id=688
| 1688 Wilkens ||  || Alexander Wilkens, Argentine astronomer || 
|-id=689
| 1689 Floris-Jan || 1930 SO || Floris-Jan van der Meulen, 5000th visitor to an astronomical exhibition || 
|-id=690
| 1690 Mayrhofer || 1948 VB || Karl Mayrhofer, Austrian mathematician and amateur astronomer || 
|-id=691
| 1691 Oort || 1956 RB || Jan Oort (1900–1992), Dutch astronomer || 
|-id=692
| 1692 Subbotina || 1936 QD || Mikhail Subbotin (1893–1966), Soviet-Russian mathematician and astronomer || 
|-id=693
| 1693 Hertzsprung || 1935 LA || Ejnar Hertzsprung (1873–1967), Danish astronomer || 
|-id=694
| 1694 Kaiser || 1934 SB || Frederik Kaiser (1808–1872), Dutch astronomer || 
|-id=695
| 1695 Walbeck || 1941 UO || Henrik Johan Walbeck (1794–1822), Finnish geodesist || 
|-id=696
| 1696 Nurmela || 1939 FF ||  (1907–1985), Finnish academic and chancellor of Turku University || 
|-id=697
| 1697 Koskenniemi || 1940 RM || Veikko Antero Koskenniemi (1885–1962), Finnish poet || 
|-id=698
| 1698 Christophe || 1934 CS || Christophe, grand-nephew of French astronomer Georges Roland who co-discovered Comet Arend–Roland || 
|-id=699
| 1699 Honkasalo || 1941 QD || Tauno Bruno Honkasalo (1912–1975), Finnish mathematician || 
|-id=700
| 1700 Zvezdara || 1940 QC || Zvezdara, Belgrade, Serbia and Montenegro || 
|}

1701–1800 

|-
| 1701 Okavango || 1953 NJ || Okavango River in southwest Africa || 
|-id=702
| 1702 Kalahari || A924 NC || Kalahari Desert, a large semi-arid sandy savannah in Southern Africa extending 900,000 km2 (350,000 sq mi) || 
|-id=703
| 1703 Barry || 1930 RB || Roger Barry (1752–1813), German astronomer at the Mannheim Observatory, which was a precursor of the Heidelberg Observatory || 
|-id=704
| 1704 Wachmann || A924 EE || Arno Arthur Wachmann (1902–1990), German astronomer and discoverer of minor planets || 
|-id=705
| 1705 Tapio ||  || Tapio, Finnish mythological figure from the Kalevala || 
|-id=706
| 1706 Dieckvoss || 1931 TS || Wilhelm Dieckvoß (1908–1982, also spelled Dieckvoss), German astronomer and a discoverer of minor planets || 
|-id=707
| 1707 Chantal || 1932 RL || Chantal, niece of French astronomer Georges Roland || 
|-id=708
| 1708 Pólit || 1929 XA || Isidre Pòlit (1880–1958), Spanish astronomer of Catalan origin and a discoverer of minor planets || 
|-id=709
| 1709 Ukraina || 1925 QA || Country of Ukraine || 
|-id=710
| 1710 Gothard || 1941 UF || Jenõ Gothard (1857–1909), Hungarian amateur astronomer || 
|-id=711
| 1711 Sandrine || 1935 BB || Sandrine, grand-niece of French astronomer Georges Roland || 
|-id=712
| 1712 Angola || 1935 KC || Country of Angola, Africa || 
|-id=713
| 1713 Bancilhon || 1951 SC || Odette Bancilhon (1908–1998), French astronomer, wife of Alfred Schmitt, and a discoverer of minor planets || 
|-id=714
| 1714 Sy || 1951 OA || Frédéric Sy, French astronomer and discoverer of minor planets || 
|-id=715
| 1715 Salli || 1938 GK || Salli, wife of Finnish astronomer Heikki A. Alikoski who discovered this minor planet || 
|-id=716
| 1716 Peter || 1934 GF || Peter, grandson of the discoverer Karl Wilhelm Reinmuth || 
|-id=717
| 1717 Arlon || 1954 AC || Arlon, a Walloon town and municipality in Belgium || 
|-id=718
| 1718 Namibia || 1942 RX || The Republic of Namibia in southern Africa, where the discoverer Marja Väisälä worked for many years, teaching the children of Finnish missionaries || 
|-id=719
| 1719 Jens || 1950 DP || Jens, grandson of discoverer Karl Reinmuth || 
|-id=720
| 1720 Niels || 1935 CQ || Niels, grandson of discoverer Karl Reinmuth || 
|-id=721
| 1721 Wells ||  || Herman B. Wells, an Indiana University administrator || 
|-id=722
| 1722 Goffin || 1938 EG || Edwin Goffin, Belgian astronomer || 
|-id=723
| 1723 Klemola || 1936 FX || Irja Klemola (1898–1995), Finnish author, esperantist, teacher and amateur astronomer, as well as for Arnold Richard Klemola (1931–2019), American astronomer and a discoverer of minor planets || 
|-id=724
| 1724 Vladimir || 1932 DC || Vladimir, grandson of Serbian astronomer Milorad B. Protić who re-discovered this asteroid in 1952 || 
|-id=725
| 1725 CrAO || 1930 SK || Crimean Astrophysical Observatory || 
|-id=726
| 1726 Hoffmeister || 1933 OE || Cuno Hoffmeister (1892–1968), German astronomer and discoverer of minor planets || 
|-id=727
| 1727 Mette || 1965 BA || Mette, wife of British astronomer A. David Andrews who discovered this Mars-crossing asteroid || 
|-id=728
| 1728 Goethe Link || 1964 TO || Goethe Link, American surgeon, amateur astronomer and donor of the Goethe Link Observatory || 
|-id=729
| 1729 Beryl || 1963 SL || Beryl Potter, staff member at Indiana University || 
|-id=730
| 1730 Marceline || 1936 UA || Heroine of L'Immoraliste, novel by André Gide || 
|-id=731
| 1731 Smuts || 1948 PH || Jan Smuts (1870–1950), prime minister of South Africa || 
|-id=732
| 1732 Heike || 1943 EY || Heike Neckel, granddaughter of Alfred Bohrmann, German astronomer || 
|-id=733
| 1733 Silke ||  || Silke Neckel, discoverer's granddaughter || 
|-id=734
| 1734 Zhongolovich || 1928 TJ || Ivan Danilovich Zhongolovich, Russian astronomer and geodesist || 
|-id=735
| 1735 ITA ||  || The Institute for Theoretical Astronomy (ITA) in St Petersburg, Russia || 
|-id=736
| 1736 Floirac || 1967 RA || Suburb of Bordeaux, France || 
|-id=737
| 1737 Severny || 1966 TJ || Andrei Borisovich Severnyi, Russian astronomer and director of the Crimean Astrophysical Observatory || 
|-id=738
| 1738 Oosterhoff || 1930 SP || P. Th. Oosterhoff (1904–1978), Dutch astronomer and General Secretary of the IAU in the 1950s || 
|-id=739
| 1739 Meyermann || 1939 PF || Bruno Meyermann (1876–1963), German astronomer || 
|-id=740
| 1740 Paavo Nurmi || 1939 UA || Paavo Nurmi (1897–1973), Finnish runner || 
|-id=741
| 1741 Giclas || 1960 BC || Henry L. Giclas (1910–2007), American astronomer and a discoverer of minor planets || 
|-id=742
| 1742 Schaifers || 1934 RO || Karl Schaifers (1921–), German astronomer at Heidelberg Observatory || 
|-id=743
| 1743 Schmidt || 4109 P-L || Bernhard Schmidt (1879–1935), a Baltic German optician who invented the Schmidt camera. || 
|-id=744
| 1744 Harriet || 6557 P-L || Wife of Paul Herget, American astronomer and director of the Cincinnati Observatory || 
|-id=745
| 1745 Ferguson ||  || James Ferguson, American astronomer and a discoverer of minor planets || 
|-id=746
| 1746 Brouwer || 1963 RF || Dirk Brouwer (1902–1966), Dutch-born American astronomer || 
|-id=747
| 1747 Wright || 1947 NH || William Wright (1871–1959), a pioneering astrophysicist at Lick Observatory || 
|-id=748
| 1748 Mauderli || 1966 RA || Sigmund Mauderli (1876–1962), Swiss astronomer and director of the Astronomical Institute of the University of Bern || 
|-id=749
| 1749 Telamon || 1949 SB || Telamon, mythological Greek King, father of Ajax and Teucer || 
|-id=750
| 1750 Eckert ||  || Wallace John Eckert (1902–1971), American astronomer || 
|-id=751
| 1751 Herget || 1955 OC || Paul Herget (1908–1981), American astronomer and director of the Cincinnati Observatory || 
|-id=752
| 1752 van Herk || 1930 OK || Gijsbert van Herk, Dutch astronomer and astrometrist at Leiden Observatory || 
|-id=753
| 1753 Mieke || 1934 JM || Mieke Oort, wife of Dutch astronomer Jan Oort || 
|-id=754
| 1754 Cunningham || 1935 FE || Leland Cunningham (1904–1989), American astronomer and discoverer of minor planets || 
|-id=755
| 1755 Lorbach || 1936 VD || Anne Lorbach Herget, wife of American astronomer Paul Herget and assistant at the Cincinnati Observatory || 
|-id=756
| 1756 Giacobini || 1937 YA || Michel Giacobini (1873–1938), French astronomer || 
|-id=757
| 1757 Porvoo || 1939 FC || Porvoo, Finland || 
|-id=758
| 1758 Naantali || 1942 DK || Naantali, Finland || 
|-id=759
| 1759 Kienle || 1942 RF || Hans Kienle (1895–1975), a German astrophysicist and director of several German observatories. Known for his work on spectrophotometry, Kienle was also president of IAU Commission 36 during 1955–1958. || 
|-id=760
| 1760 Sandra || 1950 GB || Granddaughter of South-African discoverer Ernest Leonard Johnson || 
|-id=761
| 1761 Edmondson || 1952 FN || Frank K. Edmondson (1912–2008), American astronomer || 
|-id=762
| 1762 Russell || 1953 TZ || Henry Norris Russell (1877–1957), American astronomer || 
|-id=763
| 1763 Williams ||  || Ken P. Williams, British mathematician and writer || 
|-id=764
| 1764 Cogshall ||  || Wilbur A. Cogshall, American astronomer, professor of astronomy at Indiana University and director of the Kirkwood Observatory during 1900–1944 || 
|-id=765
| 1765 Wrubel || 1957 XB || Marshal H. Wrubel, American astronomer || 
|-id=766
| 1766 Slipher || 1962 RF || Vesto Slipher (1875–1969) and his brother Earl C. Slipher (1883–1964), American astronomers || 
|-id=767
| 1767 Lampland || 1962 RJ || Carl Otto Lampland (1873–1951), American astronomer and a discoverer of minor planets || 
|-id=768
| 1768 Appenzella || 1965 SA || Appenzell, a canton of Switzerland || 
|-id=769
| 1769 Carlostorres || 1966 QP || Carlos Guillermo Torres (1910–1965), Argentine astronomer, and Carlos Torres, Chilean astronomer || 
|-id=770
| 1770 Schlesinger || 1967 JR || Frank Schlesinger (1871–1943), American astronomer || 
|-id=771
| 1771 Makover || 1968 BD || Samuel Gdalevich Makover, Russian astronomer at the Institute for Theoretical Astronomy (ITA) || 
|-id=772
| 1772 Gagarin || 1968 CB || Yuri Gagarin (1934–1968), Russian cosmonaut and the first human to journey into outer space || 
|-id=773
| 1773 Rumpelstilz || 1968 HE || Rumpelstiltskin, folk-tale character || 
|-id=774
| 1774 Kulikov ||  || Dmitri Kuzmich Kulikov, Russian astronomer at the Institute for Theoretical Astronomy (ITA) || 
|-id=775
| 1775 Zimmerwald || 1969 JA || The village of Zimmerwald in Switzerland || 
|-id=776
| 1776 Kuiper || 2520 P-L || Gerard Kuiper (1905–1973), Dutch-born American astronomer || 
|-id=777
| 1777 Gehrels || 4007 P-L || Tom Gehrels (1925–2011), Dutch-born American astronomer || 
|-id=778
| 1778 Alfvén || 4506 P-L || Hannes Alfvén (1908–1995), Swedish astrophysicist || 
|-id=779
| 1779 Paraná || 1950 LZ || The Paraná River in Argentina || 
|-id=780
| 1780 Kippes || A906 RA || Otto Kippes (1905–1994), German amateur astronomer || 
|-id=781
| 1781 Van Biesbroeck || A906 UB || George Van Biesbroeck (1880–1974), Belgian-born American astronomer || 
|-id=782
| 1782 Schneller ||  || Heribert Schneller (1901–1967), German astronomer and observer of variable stars, who worked at Babelsberg Observatory in Potsdam, Berlin || 
|-id=783
| 1783 Albitskij || 1935 FJ || Vladimir Albitsky (1891–1952), Russian astronomer and discoverer of minor planets at the Simeiz Observatory || 
|-id=784
| 1784 Benguella || 1935 MG || The city of Benguela in western Angola, Africa || 
|-id=785
| 1785 Wurm || 1941 CD || Karl Wurm (1899–1975), German astrophysicist and planetary scientist. He was president of IAU Commission 15 during 1958–1964. || 
|-id=786
| 1786 Raahe || 1948 TL || Raahe, Finland || 
|-id=787
| 1787 Chiny || 1950 SK || Chiny, a Walloon municipality of Belgium || 
|-id=788
| 1788 Kiess || 1952 OZ || Carl Clarence Kiess (1887–1967), American astronomer || 
|-id=789
| 1789 Dobrovolsky || 1966 QC || Georgy Dobrovolsky (1928–1971), Russian cosmonaut who died during the Soyuz 11 mission || 
|-id=790
| 1790 Volkov || 1967 ER || Vladislav Volkov (1935–1971), Russian cosmonaut who died during the Soyuz 11 mission || 
|-id=791
| 1791 Patsayev || 1967 RE || Viktor Patsayev (1933–1971), Russian cosmonaut who died during the Soyuz 11 mission || 
|-id=792
| 1792 Reni || 1968 BG || The town of Reni in south Ukraine, birthplace of Alexander Deutsch (1900–1986) || 
|-id=793
| 1793 Zoya || 1968 DW || Zoya Kosmodemyanskaya (1923–1941), Russian World War II heroine || 
|-id=794
| 1794 Finsen || 1970 GA || William Stephen Finsen (1905–1979), South African astronomer || 
|-id=795
| 1795 Woltjer || 4010 P-L || Jan Woltjer (1891–1946), Dutch astronomer || 
|-id=796
| 1796 Riga || 1966 KB || Riga, Latvia || 
|-id=797
| 1797 Schaumasse || 1936 VH || Alexandre Schaumasse (1882–1958), French astronomer and discoverer of minor planets || 
|-id=798
| 1798 Watts || 1949 GC || Chester Burleigh Watts (1889–1971), American astronomer || 
|-id=799
| 1799 Koussevitzky || 1950 OE || Serge Koussevitzky (1874–1951), Russian conductor || 
|-id=800
| 1800 Aguilar || 1950 RJ || Félix Aguilar (1884–1943), Argentine engineer, astronomer and director of the La Plata Observatory. The Félix Aguilar Observatory was also named after him. || 
|}

1801–1900 

|-
| 1801 Titicaca ||  || Lake Titicaca, Peru || 
|-id=802
| 1802 Zhang Heng ||  || Zhang Heng (AD 78–139), Ancient Chinese astronomer, mathematician, inventor, artist and scholar || 
|-id=803
| 1803 Zwicky || 1967 CA || Fritz Zwicky (1898–1974), Swiss astronomer || 
|-id=804
| 1804 Chebotarev || 1967 GG || Gleb Aleksandrovich Chebotarev (1913–1975), Russian astronomer || 
|-id=805
| 1805 Dirikis || 1970 GD || Matiss Dīriķis (1923–1993), Latvian astronomer || 
|-id=806
| 1806 Derice || 1971 LC || Derice Harwood, wife of Dennis N. Harwood, Australian astronomer at Perth Observatory || 
|-id=807
| 1807 Slovakia || 1971 QA || Slovakia, part of the Central European state of Czechoslovakia || 
|-id=808
| 1808 Bellerophon || 2517 P-L || Bellerophon, mythological Greek hero || 
|-id=809
| 1809 Prometheus || 2522 P-L || Prometheus, mythological Greek Titan || 
|-id=810
| 1810 Epimetheus || 4196 P-L || Epimetheus, mythological Greek Titan || 
|-id=811
| 1811 Bruwer || 4576 P-L || Jacobus Albertus Bruwer, South African astronomer || 
|-id=812
| 1812 Gilgamesh || 4645 P-L || Gilgamesh, mythological Sumerian hero || 
|-id=813
| 1813 Imhotep || 7589 P-L || Imhotep, Egyptian architect || 
|-id=814
| 1814 Bach ||  || Johann Sebastian Bach (1685–1750), German composer || 
|-id=815
| 1815 Beethoven ||  || Ludwig van Beethoven (1770–1827), German composer || 
|-id=816
| 1816 Liberia || 1936 BD || Liberia, country on the western coast of Africa || 
|-id=817
| 1817 Katanga || 1939 MB || Province of Katanga in the Democratic Republic of the Congo || 
|-id=818
| 1818 Brahms || 1939 PE || Johannes Brahms (1833–1897), German composer || 
|-id=819
| 1819 Laputa || 1948 PC || Laputa, fictional island in Gulliver's Travels || 
|-id=820
| 1820 Lohmann || 1949 PO || Werner Lohmann (1911–1983), German astronomer at Heidelberg and ARI || 
|-id=821
| 1821 Aconcagua || 1950 MB || Aconcagua, mountain in the Andes || 
|-id=822
| 1822 Waterman || 1950 OO || Alan Tower Waterman (1892–1967), American physicist, first director of the U.S. National Science Foundation || 
|-id=823
| 1823 Gliese || 1951 RD || Wilhelm Gliese (1915–1993), German astronomer || 
|-id=824
| 1824 Haworth || 1952 FM || Leland John Haworth (1904–1979), American particle physicist and NSF administrator || 
|-id=825
| 1825 Klare || 1954 QH || Gerhard Klare (born 1932), German astronomer at Heidelberg Observatory || 
|-id=826
| 1826 Miller ||  || John Anthony Miller, American astronomer at Indiana University and first director of the Kirkwood Observatory || 
|-id=827
| 1827 Atkinson || 1962 RK || Robert d'Escourt Atkinson (1898–1982), British astronomer || 
|-id=828
| 1828 Kashirina || 1966 PH || Valentin Semenovich Kashirin, Soviet physician from Simferopol, Crimea || 
|-id=829
| 1829 Dawson || 1967 JJ || Bernhard Dawson (1890–1960), Argentinian astronomer || 
|-id=830
| 1830 Pogson || 1968 HA || Norman Robert Pogson (1829–1891), English astronomer || 
|-id=831
| 1831 Nicholson || 1968 HC || Seth Barnes Nicholson (1891–1963), American astronomer || 
|-id=832
| 1832 Mrkos || 1969 PC || Antonín Mrkos (1918–1996), Czech astronomer || 
|-id=833
| 1833 Shmakova || 1969 PN || Marina Valentinovna Shmakova (1910–1971), Soviet astronomer, orbit computer and staff member at ITA || 
|-id=834
| 1834 Palach || 1969 QP || Jan Palach (1948–1969), Czech protester || 
|-id=835
| 1835 Gajdariya || 1970 OE || Arkady Gaidar (1904–1941), Russian writer || 
|-id=836
| 1836 Komarov || 1971 OT || Vladimir Komarov (1927–1967), Russian cosmonaut || 
|-id=837
| 1837 Osita ||  || Ursula Gibson, wife of American discoverer James B. Gibson ("Osita" is a Spanish translation of Ursula) || 
|-id=838
| 1838 Ursa || 1971 UC || Ursula Wild and Urs Wild, wife and son of Swiss discoverer Paul Wild. It also refers to coat of arms of the city and canton of Bern, Switzerland. || 
|-id=839
| 1839 Ragazza || 1971 UF || Italian for girl, and village of Bad Ragaz, Switzerland || 
|-id=840
| 1840 Hus || 1971 UY || Jan Hus (1369–1415), Bohemian-Czech theologian || 
|-id=841
| 1841 Masaryk ||  || Tomáš Garrigue Masaryk (1850–1937), Czechoslovak statesman || 
|-id=842
| 1842 Hynek || 1972 AA || Hynek Kohoutek, father of Czech discoverer Luboš Kohoutek || 
|-id=843
| 1843 Jarmila || 1972 AB || Jarmila Kohoutkova, mother of Czech discoverer Luboš Kohoutek || 
|-id=844
| 1844 Susilva || 1972 UB || Susi, schoolmate of Swiss discoverer Paul Wild || 
|-id=845
| 1845 Helewalda || 1972 UC || Helen, schoolmate of Swiss discoverer Paul Wild. from Wald AR, Switzerland || 
|-id=846
| 1846 Bengt || 6553 P-L || Bengt Strömgren (1908–1987), Danish astronomer and astrophysicist || 
|-id=847
| 1847 Stobbe || A916 CA || Joachim Otto Stobbe (1900–1943), German astronomer at Bergedorf Observatory || 
|-id=848
| 1848 Delvaux || 1933 QD || Delvaux, sister-in-law of Belgian astronomer Ginette Roland at Uccle Observatory || 
|-id=849
| 1849 Kresák || 1942 AB || Ľubor Kresák (1927–1994), Czech astronomer || 
|-id=850
| 1850 Kohoutek || 1942 EN || Luboš Kohoutek (born 1935), Czech astronomer || 
|-id=851
| 1851 Lacroute || 1950 VA || Pierre Lacroute, French astronomer and director of the Strasbourg Observatory || 
|-id=852
| 1852 Carpenter || 1955 GA || Edwin Francis Carpenter (1898–1963), American astronomer || 
|-id=853
| 1853 McElroy || 1957 XE || William D. McElroy (1917–1999), American biologist and biochemist || 
|-id=854
| 1854 Skvortsov ||  || Evgenii Fedorovich Skvortsov (1882–1952), Russian astronomer || 
|-id=855
| 1855 Korolev ||  || Sergei Korolev (1907–1966), Soviet rocket scientist || 
|-id=856
| 1856 Růžena ||  || Růžena Petrovičová, staff member, Kleť Observatory || 
|-id=857
| 1857 Parchomenko ||  || Praskoviya Georgievna Parchomenko (1886–1970), Ukrainian astronomer || 
|-id=858
| 1858 Lobachevskij || 1972 QL || Nikolai Lobachevsky (1792–1856), Russian mathematician || 
|-id=859
| 1859 Kovalevskaya ||  || Sofia Kovalevskaya (1850–1891), Russian mathematician || 
|-id=860
| 1860 Barbarossa || 1973 SK || Frederick I, Holy Roman Emperor (Frederick Barbarossa; 1122–1190). It was also the nickname of Jakob Stauber (1880–1952) from Trogen, Switzerland, who was a teacher of Swiss discoverer Paul Wild || 
|-id=861
| 1861 Komenský || 1970 WB || John Amos Comenius (Komenský; 1592–1670), Czech–Moravian theologian and educator || 
|-id=862
| 1862 Apollo || 1932 HA || Apollo, Greek god || 
|-id=863
| 1863 Antinous || 1948 EA || Antinous, Roman lover || 
|-id=864
| 1864 Daedalus || 1971 FA || Daedalus, mythological Greek inventor || 
|-id=865
| 1865 Cerberus || 1971 UA || Cerberus, Greek monster || 
|-id=866
| 1866 Sisyphus || 1972 XA || Sisyphus, mythological Greek || 
|-id=867
| 1867 Deiphobus || 1971 EA || Deiphobus, mythological Greek || 
|-id=868
| 1868 Thersites || 2008 P-L || Thersites, mythological Greek warrior || 
|-id=869
| 1869 Philoctetes || 4596 P-L || Philoctetes, mythological Greek warrior || 
|-id=870
| 1870 Glaukos || 1971 FE || Glaukos (Glaucus) from Greek mythology. In Homer's Iliad, he was captain in the Lycian army during the Trojan War and was killed by Ajax || 
|-id=871
| 1871 Astyanax || 1971 FF || Astyanax, infant son of Hector || 
|-id=872
| 1872 Helenos || 1971 FG || Helenus, mythological Trojan || 
|-id=873
| 1873 Agenor || 1971 FH || Agenor, mythological Greek king || 
|-id=874
| 1874 Kacivelia || A924 RC || Village of Kaciveli, near Simeiz, Crimea, location of the Black Sea Hydrographical Stations, now the Marine Hydrographical Institute || 
|-id=875
| 1875 Neruda || 1969 QQ || Jan Neruda (1834–1891), Czech writer || 
|-id=876
| 1876 Napolitania || 1970 BA || Naples, Italy || 
|-id=877
| 1877 Marsden || 1971 FC || Brian G. Marsden (1937–2010), astronomer and Director of the MPC || 
|-id=878
| 1878 Hughes || 1933 QC || Son of Mireille Demiddelaer, granddaughter of Belgian discoverer Eugène Joseph Delporte || 
|-id=879
| 1879 Broederstroom || 1935 UN || Broederstroom, South Africa || 
|-id=880
| 1880 McCrosky || 1940 AN || Richard Eugene McCrosky, American astronomer || 
|-id=881
| 1881 Shao || 1940 PC || Cheng-yuan Shao, assistant of Richard Eugene McCrosky, see 1880 McCrosky || 
|-id=882
| 1882 Rauma || 1941 UJ || Rauma, Finland || 
|-id=883
| 1883 Rimito || 1942 XA || Rymattyla, Finland || 
|-id=884
| 1884 Skip ||  || Gunter "Skip" Schwartz, American astronomer || 
|-id=885
| 1885 Herero || 1948 PJ || Herero, Bantu tribe || 
|-id=886
| 1886 Lowell || 1949 MP || Percival Lowell (1855–1916), American astronomer || 
|-id=887
| 1887 Virton || 1950 TD || Virton, Belgium || 
|-id=888
| 1888 Zu Chong-Zhi ||  || Zu Chongzhi (AD 429–500), Chinese mathematician and astronomer || 
|-id=889
| 1889 Pakhmutova || 1968 BE || Aleksandra Nikolaevna Pakhmutova, Soviet composer || 
|-id=890
| 1890 Konoshenkova || 1968 CD || Olga Petrovna Konoshenkova (19191–975), schoolmistress at the Crimean Observatory School || 
|-id=891
| 1891 Gondola || 1969 RA || The gondola || 
|-id=892
| 1892 Lucienne || 1971 SD || Lucienne Divan, French astrophysicist || 
|-id=893
| 1893 Jakoba || 1971 UD || Jakob Oberholzer (1862–1939), Swiss geologist and grandfather of discoverer Paul Wild || 
|-id=894
| 1894 Haffner || 1971 UH || Hans Haffner (1912–1977), German astronomer at Bergedorf Observatory || 
|-id=895
| 1895 Larink || 1971 UZ || Johannes Larink (1893–1988), German astronomer at Bergedorf Observatory || 
|-id=896
| 1896 Beer ||  || Arthur Beer (1900–1980), German astronomer || 
|-id=897
| 1897 Hind ||  || John Russell Hind (1823–1895), English astronomer || 
|-id=898
| 1898 Cowell ||  || Philip Herbert Cowell (1870–1949), British astronomer || 
|-id=899
| 1899 Crommelin ||  || Andrew Claude de la Cherois Crommelin (1865–1939), British astronomer || 
|-id=900
| 1900 Katyusha || 1971 YB || Yekaterina Zelenko (1916–1941), Soviet war pilot || 
|}

1901–2000 

|-
| 1901 Moravia || 1972 AD || Moravia, a region in the east of the Czech Republic || 
|-id=902
| 1902 Shaposhnikov || 1972 HU || Vladimir Grigorevich Shaposhnikov (1905–1942), Russian astrometrist at Simeiz Observatory || 
|-id=903
| 1903 Adzhimushkaj || 1972 JL || Adzhimushkaj, battle site in World War II || 
|-id=904
| 1904 Massevitch || 1972 JM || Alla Genrikhovna Massevich, Russian astronomer and astrophysicist || 
|-id=905
| 1905 Ambartsumian || 1972 JZ || Victor Ambartsumian (1908–1996), Armenian-Russian astronomer || 
|-id=906
| 1906 Naef || 1972 RC || Robert A. Naef (1907–1975), Swiss amateur astronomer after whom the Observatory Naef Épendes is also named || 
|-id=907
| 1907 Rudneva ||  || Yevgeniya Rudneva (1920–1944), Russian World War II heroine || 
|-id=908
| 1908 Pobeda ||  || Russian for victory || 
|-id=909
| 1909 Alekhin ||  || Alexander Alekhine (1892–1946), Russian chess player || 
|-id=910
| 1910 Mikhailov ||  || Aleksandr Aleksandrovich Mikhailov (1888–1983), Russian astronomer || 
|-id=911
| 1911 Schubart || 1973 UD || Joachim Schubart (1928–), German astronomer † || 
|-id=912
| 1912 Anubis || 6534 P-L || Anubis, Ancient Egyptian god || 
|-id=913
| 1913 Sekanina || 1928 SF || Zdenek Sekanina (born 1936), Czech-born American astronomer || 
|-id=914
| 1914 Hartbeespoortdam ||  || Hartbeespoortdam, lake in South Africa || 
|-id=915
| 1915 Quetzálcoatl || 1953 EA || Quetzalcoatl, Aztec god || 
|-id=916
| 1916 Boreas || 1953 RA || Boreas, Greek god || 
|-id=917
| 1917 Cuyo || 1968 AA || University of Cuyo, Argentina || 
|-id=918
| 1918 Aiguillon || 1968 UA || Aiguillon, France || 
|-id=919
| 1919 Clemence || 1971 SA || Gerald Maurice Clemence (1908–1974), American astronomer || 
|-id=920
| 1920 Sarmiento || 1971 VO || Domingo Sarmiento (1811–1888), president of Argentina between 1868 and 1874, who supported American astronomer Benjamin Apthorp Gould in founding the Argentine National Observatory in Cordoba || 
|-id=921
| 1921 Pala || 1973 SE || Pala, tribe of Native Americans || 
|-id=922
| 1922 Zulu || 1949 HC || The Zulu people of Africa || 
|-id=923
| 1923 Osiris || 4011 P-L || Osiris, Ancient Egyptian god || 
|-id=924
| 1924 Horus || 4023 P-L || Horus, Ancient Egyptian god || 
|-id=925
| 1925 Franklin-Adams || 1934 RY || John Franklin-Adams (1843–1912), British amateur astronomer || 
|-id=926
| 1926 Demiddelaer || 1935 JA || Mireille Demiddelaer, granddaughter of Belgian discoverer Eugène Joseph Delporte || 
|-id=927
| 1927 Suvanto || 1936 FP || Rafael Suvanto, an assistant of Finnish astronomer Yrjö Väisälä at Turku Observatory || 
|-id=928
| 1928 Summa || 1938 SO || Village in Finland where the Battle of Summa took place during the Winter War in 1939/40 || 
|-id=929
| 1929 Kollaa || 1939 BS || Kollaa River in Russia, where the Battle of Kollaa took place during the Winter War in 1939/40 || 
|-id=930
| 1930 Lucifer || 1964 UA || Lucifer, the rebellious archangel, identified with Satan, who was expelled from heaven || 
|-id=931
| 1931 Čapek || 1969 QB || Karel Čapek (1890–1938), Czech playwright || 
|-id=932
| 1932 Jansky ||  || Karl Guthe Jansky (1905–1950), American astronomer || 
|-id=933
| 1933 Tinchen || 1972 AC || Christine Kohoutek, wife of Czech discoverer Luboš Kohoutek || 
|-id=934
| 1934 Jeffers || 1972 XB || Hamilton Jeffers (1893–1976), American astronomer || 
|-id=935
| 1935 Lucerna || 1973 RB || The city of Lucerne, Switzerland || 
|-id=936
| 1936 Lugano || 1973 WD || The city of Lugano, Switzerland || 
|-id=937
| 1937 Locarno || 1973 YA || The city of Locarno, Switzerland || 
|-id=938
| 1938 Lausanna || 1974 HC || The city of Lausanne, Switzerland || 
|-id=939
| 1939 Loretta || 1974 UC || Loretta Kowal, daughter of American discoverer Charles T. Kowal || 
|-id=940
| 1940 Whipple || 1975 CA || Fred Lawrence Whipple (1906–2004), American astronomer || 
|-id=941
| 1941 Wild ||  || Paul Wild (1925–2014), Swiss astronomer || 
|-id=942
| 1942 Jablunka || 1972 SA || Jablůnka, a village in Moravia || 
|-id=943
| 1943 Anteros || 1973 EC || Anteros, Greek mythology || 
|-id=944
| 1944 Günter || 1925 RA || Günter Reinmuth, son of German discoverer Karl Reinmuth || 
|-id=945
| 1945 Wesselink || 1930 OL || Adriaan Wesselink (1909–1995), Dutch astronomer || 
|-id=946
| 1946 Walraven || 1931 PH || Theodore Walraven, Dutch astronomer || 
|-id=947
| 1947 Iso-Heikkilä || 1935 EA || Iso-Heikkilä, Finnish observatory || 
|-id=948
| 1948 Kampala || 1935 GL || Kampala, Uganda || 
|-id=949
| 1949 Messina || 1936 NE || Messina, South Africa || 
|-id=950
| 1950 Wempe || 1942 EO || Johann Wempe (1906–1980), German astronomer || 
|-id=951
| 1951 Lick || 1949 OA || James Lick (1796–1876), American patron of science || 
|-id=952
| 1952 Hesburgh || 1951 JC || Theodore Hesburgh (1917–2015), American president of University of Notre Dame || 
|-id=953
| 1953 Rupertwildt || 1951 UK || Rupert Wildt (1905–1976), German-born American astronomer || 
|-id=954
| 1954 Kukarkin || 1952 PH || Boris Vasilyevich Kukarkin (1909–1977), Russian astronomer || 
|-id=955
| 1955 McMath || 1963 SR || Robert Raynolds McMath (1891–1962), American astronomer || 
|-id=956
| 1956 Artek ||  || International Children's Center "Artek" on the Crimean peninsula || 
|-id=957
| 1957 Angara || 1970 GF || The Angara River in Siberia, Russia || 
|-id=958
| 1958 Chandra || 1970 SB || Subrahmanyan Chandrasekhar (1910–1995), Indian astrophysicist || 
|-id=959
| 1959 Karbyshev || 1972 NB || Dmitry Karbyshev (1880–1945), Soviet military leader || 
|-id=960
| 1960 Guisan || 1973 UA || Henri Guisan (1874–1960), Swiss general in World War II || 
|-id=961
| 1961 Dufour || 1973 WA || Henri Dufour (1787–1875), Swiss general || 
|-id=962
| 1962 Dunant || 1973 WE || Henry Dunant (1828–1910), Swiss founder of the Red Cross || 
|-id=963
| 1963 Bezovec || 1975 CB || Bezovec hill near Piešťany in western Slovakia, where numerous meteorites have been found Src || 
|-id=964
| 1964 Luyten || 2007 P-L || Willem Jacob Luyten (1899–1994), Dutch-born American astronomer || 
|-id=965
| 1965 van de Kamp || 2521 P-L || Peter van de Kamp (1901–1995), Dutch-born American astronomer || 
|-id=966
| 1966 Tristan || 2552 P-L || Tristan, Knight of the Round Table || 
|-id=967
| 1967 Menzel || A905 VC || Donald Howard Menzel (1901–1976), American astronomer || 
|-id=968
| 1968 Mehltretter || 1932 BK || Johannes Peter Mehltretter (1934–1982), German astronomer || 
|-id=969
| 1969 Alain || 1935 CG || Alain Vanheste, husband of the granddaughter of the Belgian discoverer Sylvain Arend || 
|-id=970
| 1970 Sumeria || 1954 ER || Sumer, ancient kingdom || 
|-id=971
| 1971 Hagihara ||  || Yusuke Hagihara (1897–1979), Japanese astronomer || 
|-id=972
| 1972 Yi Xing ||  || Yi Xing (683–727), Chinese astronomer || 
|-id=973
| 1973 Colocolo || 1968 OA || Colocolo, an Araucanian chief in Chile || 
|-id=974
| 1974 Caupolican || 1968 OE || Caupolican, Araucanian chief || 
|-id=975
| 1975 Pikelner || 1969 PH || Solomon Pikelner (1921–1975), Russian astronomer || 
|-id=976
| 1976 Kaverin || 1970 GC || Aleksej Aleksandrovich Kaverin (1904–1976), an instructor in astronomy at Irkutsk Pedagogical Institute, Russia || 
|-id=977
| 1977 Shura || 1970 QY || Aleksandr Kosmodemyanskii (1925–1945), Soviet war hero || 
|-id=978
| 1978 Patrice || 1971 LD || Patrice Harwood, daughter of Australian astronomer Dennis N. Harwood, see  || 
|-id=979
| 1979 Sakharov || 2006 P-L || Andrei Sakharov (1921–1989), Russian physicist || 
|-id=980
| 1980 Tezcatlipoca || 1950 LA || Tezcatlipoca, Aztec god || 
|-id=981
| 1981 Midas || 1973 EA || Midas, mythological Greek king || 
|-id=982
| 1982 Cline || 1975 VA || Edwin Lee Cline, inventor || 
|-id=983
| 1983 Bok || 1975 LB || Bart Jan Bok (1906–1983), Dutch-born American astronomer and his wife Priscilla Fairfield Bok (1896–1975), American astronomer || 
|-id=984
| 1984 Fedynskij || 1926 TN || Vsevolod Vladimirovich Fedynskii (1908–1978), Russian geophysicist || 
|-id=985
| 1985 Hopmann || 1929 AE || Josef Hopmann (1890–1975), German astronomer || 
|-id=986
| 1986 Plaut ||  || Lukas Plaut (1910–1984), Dutch astronomer || 
|-id=987
| 1987 Kaplan || 1952 RH || Samuil Aronovich Kaplan (1921–1978), Russian astronomer at Lvov Observatory and at the Radiophysical Research Institute in Nizhny Novgorod, Russia || 
|-id=988
| 1988 Delores || 1952 SV || Delores Owings, staff member, Indiana University || 
|-id=989
| 1989 Tatry || 1955 FG || Vysoké Tatry, mountain range in Slovakia || 
|-id=990
| 1990 Pilcher || 1956 EE || Frederick Pilcher (born 1939/40), American astronomer || 
|-id=991
| 1991 Darwin || 1967 JL || Charles Darwin (1809–1882), British naturalist, and Sir George Darwin (1845–1912), British astronomer and mathematician || 
|-id=992
| 1992 Galvarino || 1968 OD || Galvarino, Araucanian chief || 
|-id=993
| 1993 Guacolda ||  || Guacolda, wife of Araucanian chief Lautaro || 
|-id=994
| 1994 Shane || 1961 TE || C. Donald Shane (1895–1983), American astronomer || 
|-id=995
| 1995 Hajek ||  || Tadeáš Hájek (1525–1600), Czech astronomer || 
|-id=996
| 1996 Adams || 1961 UA || John Couch Adams (1819–1892), British mathematician and astronomer || 
|-id=997
| 1997 Leverrier || 1963 RC || Urbain Le Verrier (1811–1877), French astronomer || 
|-id=998
| 1998 Titius ||  || Johann Daniel Titius (1729–1796), German astronomer || 
|-id=999
| 1999 Hirayama || 1973 DR || Kiyotsugu Hirayama (1874–1943), Japanese astronomer || 
|-id=000
| 2000 Herschel || 1960 OA || William Herschel (1738–1822), German-born British astronomer and composer || 
|}

References 

001001-002000